= Monkeys and apes in space =

Space travel by primates

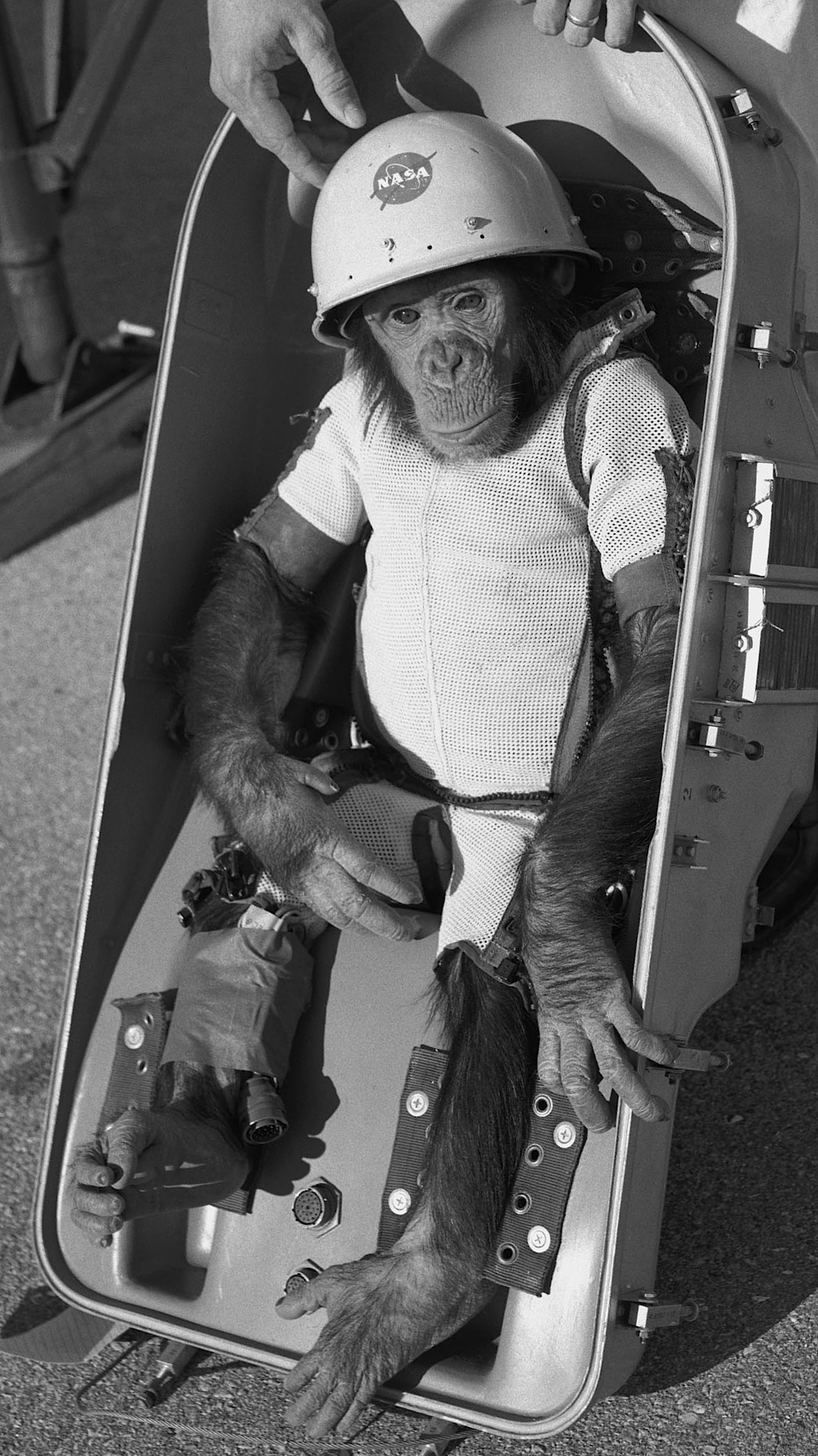
Ham, a chimpanzee, became the first ape in space during his January 31, 1961, suborbital flight aboard Mercury-Redstone 2

Before humans went into space in the 1960s, several other animals were launched into space, including numerous other primates, so that scientists could investigate the biological effects of spaceflight. The United States launched flights containing primate passengers primarily between 1948 and 1961 with one flight in 1969 and one in 1985. France launched two monkey-carrying flights in 1967. The Soviet Union and Russia launched monkeys between 1983 and 1996. Most primates were anesthetized before lift-off.

Over thirty-two non-human primates flew in the space program; none flew more than once. Numerous backup primates also went through the programs but never flew. Monkeys and non-human apes from several species were used, including rhesus macaques, crab-eating macaques, squirrel monkeys, pig-tailed macaques, and chimpanzees.

== United States ==
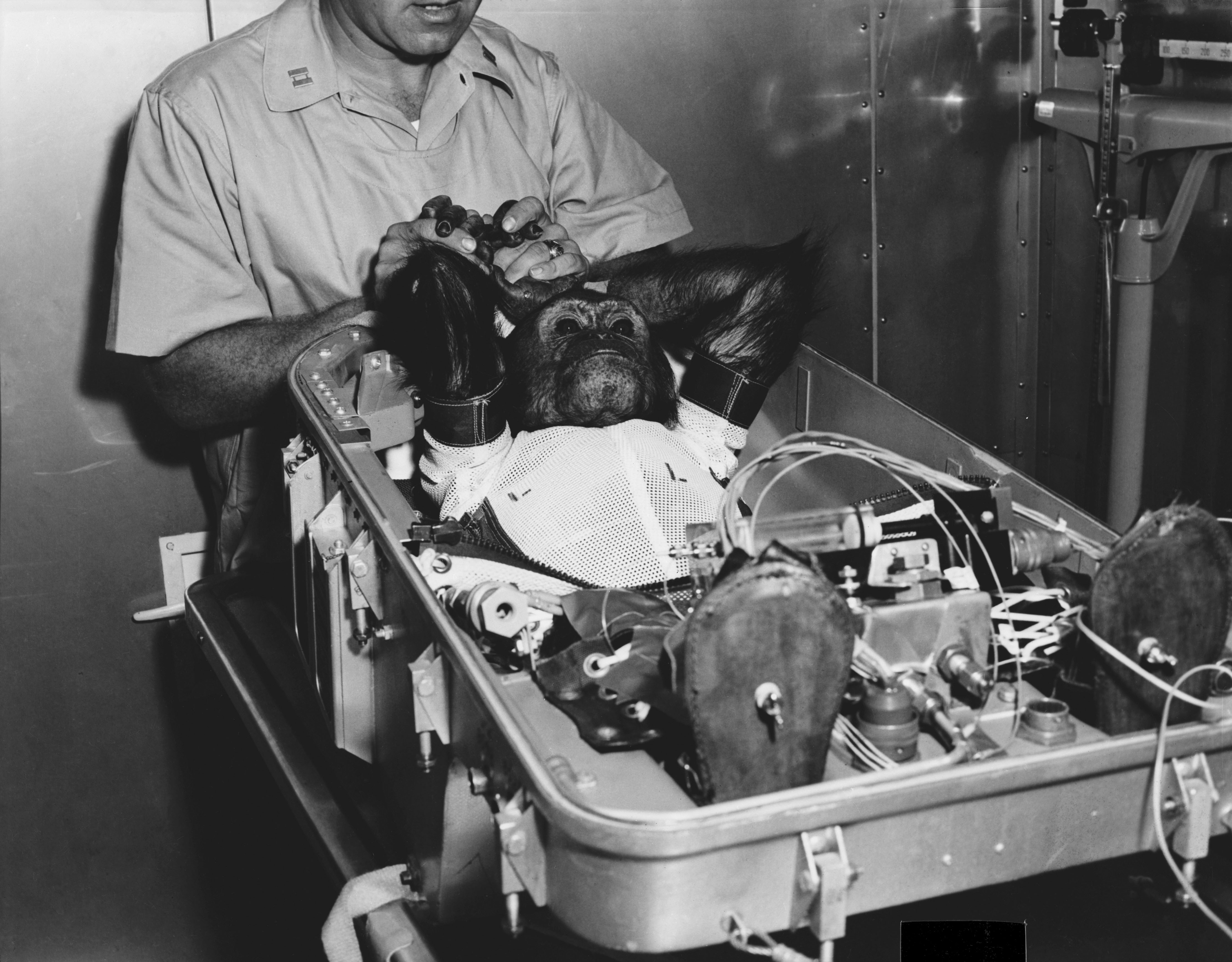
Enos, the third great ape and only chimpanzee to orbit the Earth, being prepared for launch on Mercury-Atlas 5 (November 29, 1961)

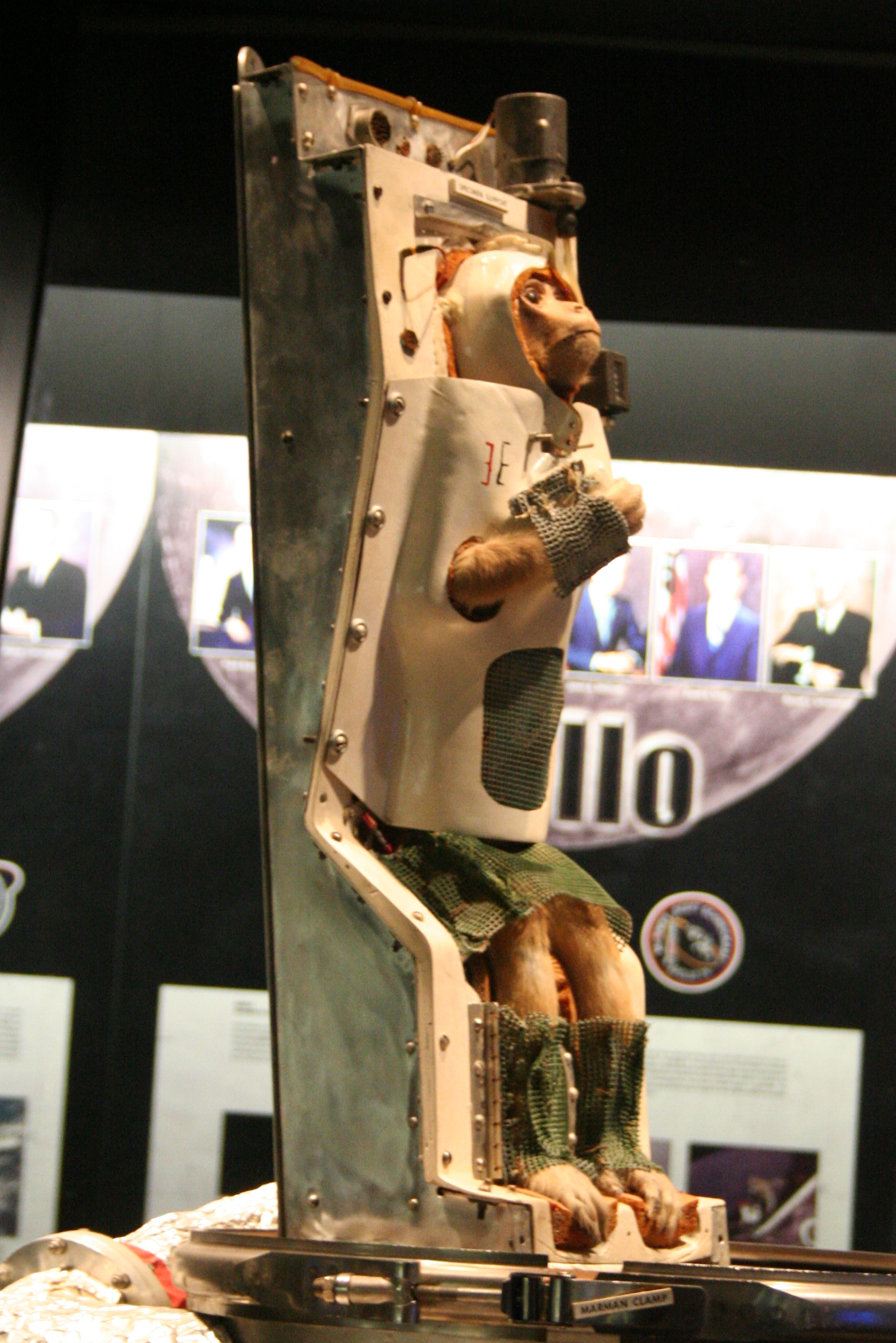
Able, who flew on the first two monkey space mission in May 1959, on display at the National Air and Space Museum

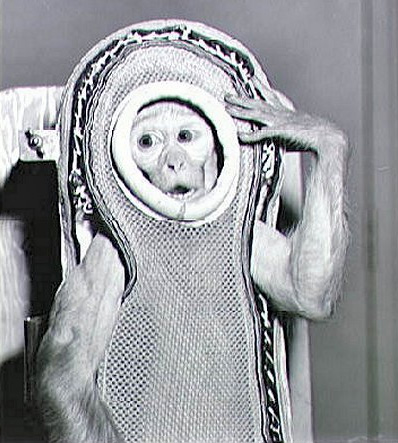
Sam, a rhesus macaque, flew to an altitude of 88 km (55 mi) on December 4, 1959, on a NASA rocket, Little Joe 2

The first primate launched into high subspace, although not a space flight, was Albert I, a rhesus macaque, who on June 18, 1948, rode a rocket flight to over 63 km (39 mi) in Earth's atmosphere on a V-2 rocket. Albert I died of suffocation during the flight and may actually have died in the cramped space capsule before launch.

On June 14, 1949, Albert II survived a sub-orbital V-2 flight into space, but died on impact after a parachute failure, to become the first monkey, first primate, and first mammal in space. His flight reached 134 km (83 mi) – past the Kármán line of 100 km (62 mi), which designates the beginning of space.

On September 16, 1949, Albert III died below the Kármán line, at 11 km (35,000 ft), in an explosion of his V-2 rocket. On December 8, Albert IV, the second mammal in space, flew on the last monkey V-2 flight and died on impact after another parachute failure after reaching 130.6 km (81.2 mi). Albert I, II, and IV were rhesus macaques while Albert III was a crab-eating macaque.

Monkeys later flew on Aerobee rockets. On April 18, 1951, a monkey, possibly called Albert V, died due to parachute failure. Yorick, also called Albert VI, along with 11 mouse crewmates, reached 72 km (44.7 mi) and survived the landing, on September 20, 1951, the first monkey to do so (the dogs Dezik and Tsygan had survived a trip to space in July of that year), although he died two hours later. Two of the mice also died after recovery; all of the deaths were thought to be related to stress from overheating in the sealed capsule in the New Mexico sun while awaiting the recovery team. Albert VI's flight surpassed the 50-mile (80 km) boundary the U.S. used for spaceflight, but was below the international definition of space. Patricia and Mike, two cynomolgus monkeys, flew on May 21, 1952, and survived, but their flight was only to 26 km (16 mi).

On December 13, 1958, Gordo, also called Old Reliable, a squirrel monkey, survived being launched aboard Jupiter AM-13 by the United States Army. After flying for over 2,400 km (1,500 mi) and reaching a height of 500 km (310 mi) before returning to Earth, Gordo landed in the South Atlantic and was killed due to mechanical failure of the parachute recovery system in the rocket nose cone.

On May 28, 1959, aboard the JUPITER AM-18, Miss Able, a rhesus macaque, and Miss Baker, a squirrel monkey from Peru, flew a successful mission. Able was born at the Ralph Mitchell Zoo in Independence, Kansas. They traveled in excess of 16,000 km/h (9,900 mph), and withstood 38 g (373 m/s^{2}). Able died June 1, 1959, while undergoing surgery to remove an infected medical electrode, from a reaction to the anesthesia. Baker became the first monkey to survive the stresses of spaceflight and the related medical procedures. Baker died November 29, 1984, at the age of 27 and is buried on the grounds of the United States Space & Rocket Center in Huntsville, Alabama. Able was preserved, and is now on display at the Smithsonian Institution's National Air and Space Museum. Their names were taken from the 1943–1955 US military phonetic alphabet.

On December 4, 1959, from Wallops Island, Virginia, Sam, a rhesus macaque, flew on the Little Joe 2 in the Mercury program to 85 km (53 mi) high. On January 21, 1960, Miss Sam, also a rhesus macaque, followed, on Little Joe 1B although her flight was only to 13 km (8 mi) in a test of emergency procedures.

Chimpanzees Ham and Enos also flew in the Mercury program, with Ham becoming the first great ape or Hominidae in space. The names "Sam" and "Ham" were acronyms. Sam was named in homage to the School of Aerospace Medicine at Brooks Air Force Base in San Antonio, Texas, and the name "Ham" was taken from Holloman Aerospace Medicine at Holloman Air Force Base, New Mexico. Ham and Enos were among 60 chimpanzees brought to New Mexico by the U.S. Air Force for space flight tests. Six were selected to be trained at Cape Canaveral by Tony Gentry et al.

Goliath, a squirrel monkey, died in the explosion of his Atlas rocket on November 10, 1961. A rhesus macaque called Scatback flew a sub-orbital flight on December 20, 1961, but was lost at sea after landing.

Bonny, a pig-tailed macaque, flew on Biosatellite 3, a mission that lasted from June 29 to July 8, 1969. This was the first multi-day monkey flight, but came after longer human spaceflights were common. He died within a day of landing.

The Space Shuttle Challenger flight STS-51-B featured two squirrel monkeys named No. 3165 and No. 384-80. The flight was from April 29 to May 6, 1985.

== France ==
France launched a pig-tailed macaque named Martine on a Vesta rocket on March 7, 1967, and another named Pierrette on March 13. These suborbital flights reached 243 km (151 mi) and 234 km (145 mi), respectively. Martine became the first monkey to survive more than a couple of hours after flying above the international definition of the edge of space (Ham and Enos, launched earlier by the United States, were chimpanzees).

== Soviet Union and later Russia ==
The Soviet / Russian space program used only rhesus macaques in its Bion satellite program in 1980s and 1990s. The names of the monkeys began with sequential letters of the Russian alphabet (А, Б, В, Г, Д, Е, Ё, Ж, З...). The animals all survived their missions but for a single fatality in post-flight surgery, after which the program was canceled.

1. The first monkeys launched by Soviet space program, Abrek and Bion, flew on Bion 6. They remained aloft from December 14, 1983 – December 20, 1983.
2. Next came Bion 7 with monkeys Verny and Gordy from July 10, 1985 – July 17, 1985.
3. Then Dryoma and Yerosha on Bion 8 from September 29, 1987 – October 12, 1987. After returning from space Dryoma was presented to Cuban leader Fidel Castro.
4. Bion 9 with monkeys Zhakonya and Zabiyaka followed from September 15, 1989, to September 28, 1989. The two took the space endurance record for monkeys at 13 days, 17 hours in space.
5. Monkeys Ivasha and Krosh flew on Bion 10 from December 29, 1992, to January 7, 1993. Krosh produced offspring, after rehabilitation upon returning to Earth.
6. Lapik and Multik were the last monkeys in space until Iran launched one of its own in 2013. The pair flew aboard Bion 11 from December 24, 1996, to January 7, 1997. Upon return, Multik died while under anesthesia for US biopsy sampling on January 8. Lapik nearly died while undergoing the identical procedure. No follow-up research has been conducted to determine whether these two incidents, together with the 1959 loss of the US monkey Able in post-flight surgery, contraindicate the administration of anesthesia during or shortly after spaceflights. Further US support of the Bion program was canceled.

== Argentina ==
On December 23, 1969 in Chamical, La Rioja, as part of the 'Operación Navidad' (Operation Christmas), Argentina launched Juan (a tufted capuchin, native to Argentina's Misiones Province) using a two-stage Rigel 04 rocket. It ascended perhaps up to 82 km (51 mi) and then was recovered successfully. Other sources give 30, 60, or 72 km (19, 37, or 45 mi). All of these are below the international definition of space (100 km). Later, on February 1, 1970, the experience was repeated with a female monkey of the same species using an X-1 Panther rocket. Although it reached a higher altitude than its predecessor, it was lost after the capsule's parachute failed.

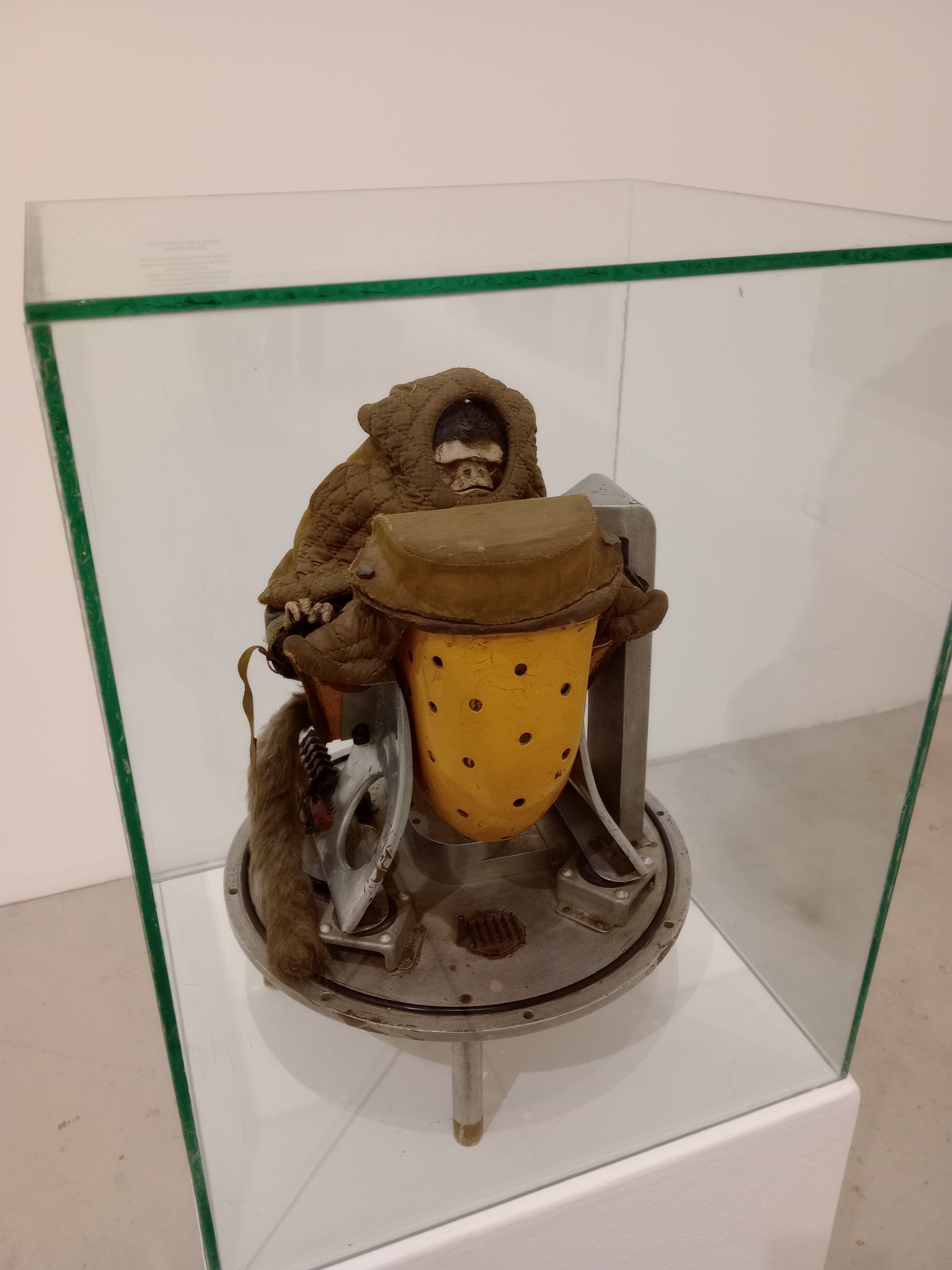
Juan in its Canopus II cabin

== China ==
The PRC spacecraft Shenzhou 2 launched on January 9, 2001. It is rumored that inside the reentry module (precise information is lacking due to the secrecy surrounding China's space program) a monkey, dog, and rabbit rode aloft in a test of the spacecraft's life support systems. The SZ2 reentry module landed in Inner Mongolia on January 16. No images of the recovered capsule appeared in the press, leading to the widespread inference that the flight ended in failure. According to press reports citing an unnamed source, a parachute connection malfunction caused a hard landing.

== Iran ==
On January 28, 2013, AFP and Sky News reported that Iran had sent a monkey in a "Pishgam" rocket to a height of 116 km (72 mi) and retrieved "shipment". Iranian media gave no details on the timing or location of the launch, while details that were reported raised questions about the claim. Pre-flight and post-flight photos clearly showed different monkeys. The confusion was due to the publishing of an archive photo from 2011 by the Iranian Student News Agency (ISNA). According to Jonathan McDowell, a Harvard astronomer, "They just mixed that footage with the footage of the 2013 successful launch."

On December 14, 2013, AFP and BBC reported that Iran again sent a monkey to space and safely returned it. Rhesus macaques Aftab and Fargam were each launched separately into space and safely returned. Researchers continue to study the effects of the space trip on their offspring.

== In popular culture ==
The 2014 animated series All Hail King Julien: Exiled features a horde of highly intelligent chimpanzee cosmonauts, whom they claim the USSR abandoned on a Madagascar islet following the end of the Space Race. Although faithful to "Mother Russia", the chimpanzees vow to take revenge on humankind for declaring their obsolescence.

Folk musician Heather Maloney's song "Albert 1-5" is inspired by the first five macaques used in the United States space program who did not survive their space flights.

The video game Go Ape Ship! was inspired by monkey spaceflights, and features a fictional spaceship manned by an all-monkey crew. The game's mascot, Albert, is named after Albert I (monkey), the first mammal launched on a rocket.

The season 11 episode 11 of Paw Patrol launched a monkey “Captain Gordy” and accidentally Mayor Humdinger into space from Adventure Bay Space Centre. Mayor Humdinger conducted the first space walk in Paw Patrol history. A rescue mission was launched by the Air Rescue Pups under the command of Ryder.

== See also ==
- Laika
- Soviet space dogs
- Ham (chimpanzee)
- Human spaceflight
- Animals in space
- Space exploration
- List of individual apes
- List of individual monkeys
- Alice King Chatham (sculptor who designed oxygen masks and safety gear for animals in the US space program)
- Captain Simian & the Space Monkeys (1996 television series)
- Space Chimps (2008 film)
- One Small Step: The Story of the Space Chimps (2008 documentary)
- Animal testing on non-human primates
