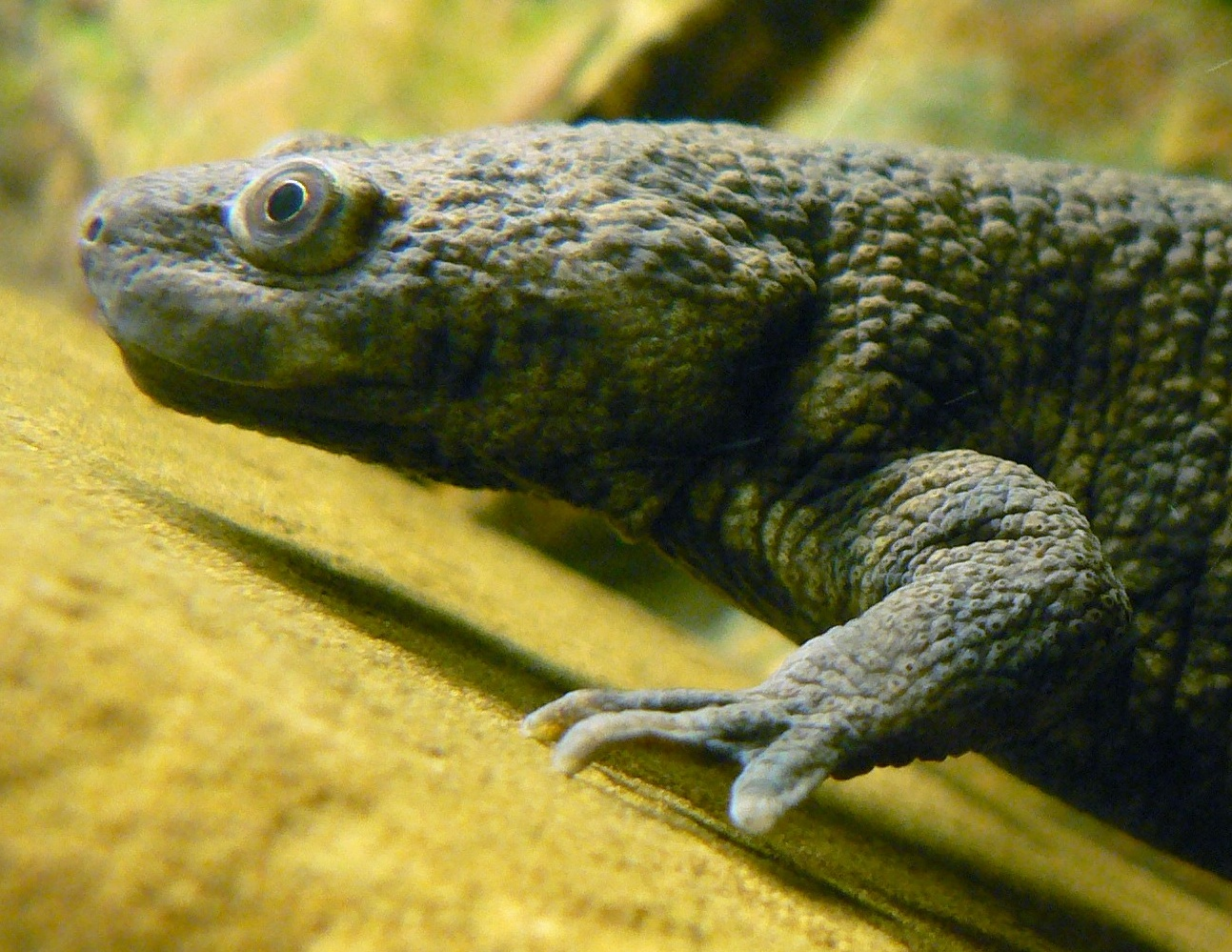
- Pleurodeles waltl in an aquarium

Conservation status
- Least Concern (IUCN 3.1)

Scientific classification
- Kingdom: Animalia
- Phylum: Chordata
- Class: Amphibia
- Order: Urodela
- Family: Salamandridae
- Genus: Pleurodeles
- Species: P. waltl

Binomial name
- Pleurodeles waltl Michahelles, 1830
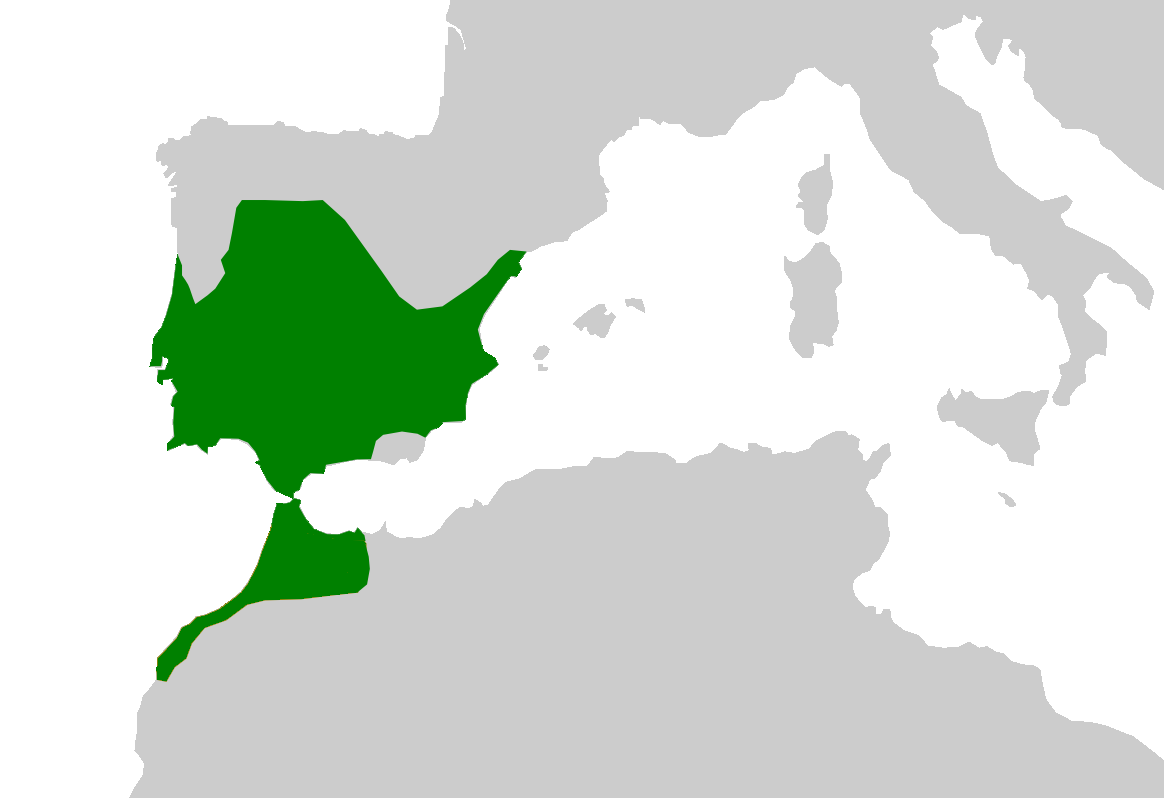
- Distribution in the Iberian peninsula and the Maghreb

Synonyms
- Pleurodeles waltlii (incorrect spelling)

= Iberian ribbed newt =

Species of amphibian

The Iberian ribbed newt (Pleurodeles waltl), also known commonly as the Spanish ribbed newt and gallipato in Spanish, is a species of salamander in the subfamily Pleurodelinae of the family Salamandridae. The species is native to the central and southern Iberian Peninsula and northern Morocco. It is the largest European newt species. It is known for its defense mechanisms where their sharp ribs puncture through its sides when in a defensive state, and as such is also called the sharp-ribbed newt and the sharp-ribbed salamander.

This species should not be confused with a different species with a similar common name, the Iberian newt (Lissotriton boscai).

== Description ==
The Iberian ribbed newt typically have 8 to 10 tubercles that look like orange warts running down each side. Through these, its sharp ribs can puncture through the stretched skin. The size of their ribs are larger than most other salamanders. The ribs act as a defense mechanism, causing little harm to the newt. Iberian ribbed newts generally try to run away from predators, but if they cannot escape they resort to this mechanism. It could be considered as a primitive and rudimentary system of envenomation, but is completely harmless to humans. At the same time as pushing its ribs out the newt begins to secrete a milky and viscous poison from special glands on its body. The poison primarily appears on the neck, the dorsal and lateral trunk, and on the tail. The poison coated ribs create a highly effective stinging mechanism, injecting toxins through the thin skin in predator's mouths. The newt's immune system, collagen coated ribs, and secretion of antimicrobial peptides released from specialized cutaneous glands mean the pierced skin quickly regrows without infection.

Similar to most amphibians, Iberian ribbed newts are born in the water and breathe through their gills during the larvae phase. Once they start to grow limbs, they lose their gills and gain the ability to survive on land as well as in water. P. waltl is more aquatic-dwelling than many other European tailed amphibians. Though it is quite able to walk on land, most rarely leave the water, living usually in ponds, cisterns, and ancient village wells that were common in Portugal and Spain in the past. They have also been found inhabiting areas in northwestern Africa. It prefers cool, quiet, and deep waters, where it feeds on insects, aquatic molluscs, worms, and tadpoles. During warmer seasons some of these water sources dry up and the newts migrate to moist areas under rocks or with vegetation. In order to adapt to the different types stimuli found in these different habitats, it has been found that Iberian ribbed newts possess physiological and behavioral plasticity.

In the wild, this amphibian grows to a total length (tail included) of 30 cm (12 in), but rarely more than 20 cm (7.9 in) in captivity. Its color is dark gray dorsally, and lighter gray on its ventral side, with rust-colored small spots where its ribs can protrude. A leucistic variant is present in populations kept in captivity. This newt has a flat, spade-shaped head and a long tail, which is about half its body length. Males are more slender and usually smaller than females. The larvae have bushy external gills and usually paler color patterns than the adults.

== Sex determination ==
Sex determination in P. waltl is regulated by sex chromosomes, but can be overridden by temperature. Females have both sex chromosomes (Z and W), while males have two copies of the Z chromosome (ZZ). However, when ZW larvae are reared at 32 °C (90 °F) during particular stages of development (stage 42 to stage 54), they differentiate into functional neomales. Hormones play an important role during the sex determination process, and the newts can be manipulated to change sex by adding hormones or hormone-inhibitors to the water in which they are reared.

Aromatase, an estrogen-synthesizing enzyme which acts as a steroid hormone, plays a key role in sex determination in many non-mammalian vertebrates, including the Iberian ribbed newt. It is found in higher levels in the gonad–mesonephros complexes in ZW larvae than in their ZZ counterparts, although not in heat-treated ZW larvae. The increase occurs near the final stages of which their sex can be determined by temperature (stage 52).

== Conservation ==
As of an assessment in October 2020, the IUCN has listed the Iberian ribbed newt as a species of Least Concern. This species is abundant in Morocco and in southern parts of Spain (Andalusia, Extremadura, and southern Portugal). Though their population decreasing in other areas such as northern and central Portugal and in eastern Spain. Previously, it was listed as Near Threatened in a 2006 and 2009 assessment. It received this listing because its wild populations had significantly declined due to widespread habitat loss and the effects of invasive species, thus making the species close to qualifying for Vulnerable. This species is generally threatened through loss of aquatic habitats through drainage, agrochemical pollution, the impacts of livestock (in North African dayas), eutrophication, domestic and industrial contamination, golf courses, and infrastructure development. It has largely disappeared from coastal areas in Iberia and Morocco close to concentrations of tourism and highly populated areas such as Madrid's outskirts. Introduced species such as the largemouth bass and crayfish (Procambarus clarkii) are known to prey on the eggs and larvae of this species, and are implicated in its decline. Mortality on roads has been reported to be a serious threat to some populations.

== Space experiments ==
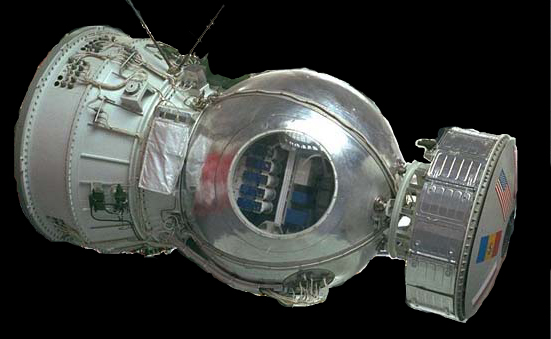
In 1985, the Bion 7 spacecraft, similar to the bion satellite shown here, first carried the Iberian ribbed newt into space. The circular viewport seen on this craft was installed for its display in a space museum.

P. waltl has been studied in space on at least six missions. The first Iberian ribbed newts were sent to space in 1985 on board Bion 7. The ten newts shared their journey with two rhesus macaques and ten rats, in an otherwise crewless Soviet Kosmos satellite. In 1992, Bion 10 also carried the newts on board, as did Bion 11 in 1996.

P. waltl research was continued later in 1996 by French-led experiments on the Mir space station (Mir Cassiopée expedition), with follow-up studies in 1998 (Mir Pégase expedition) and 1999 (Mir Perseus expedition). Foton-M2 also carried the Iberian ribbed newt in 2005.

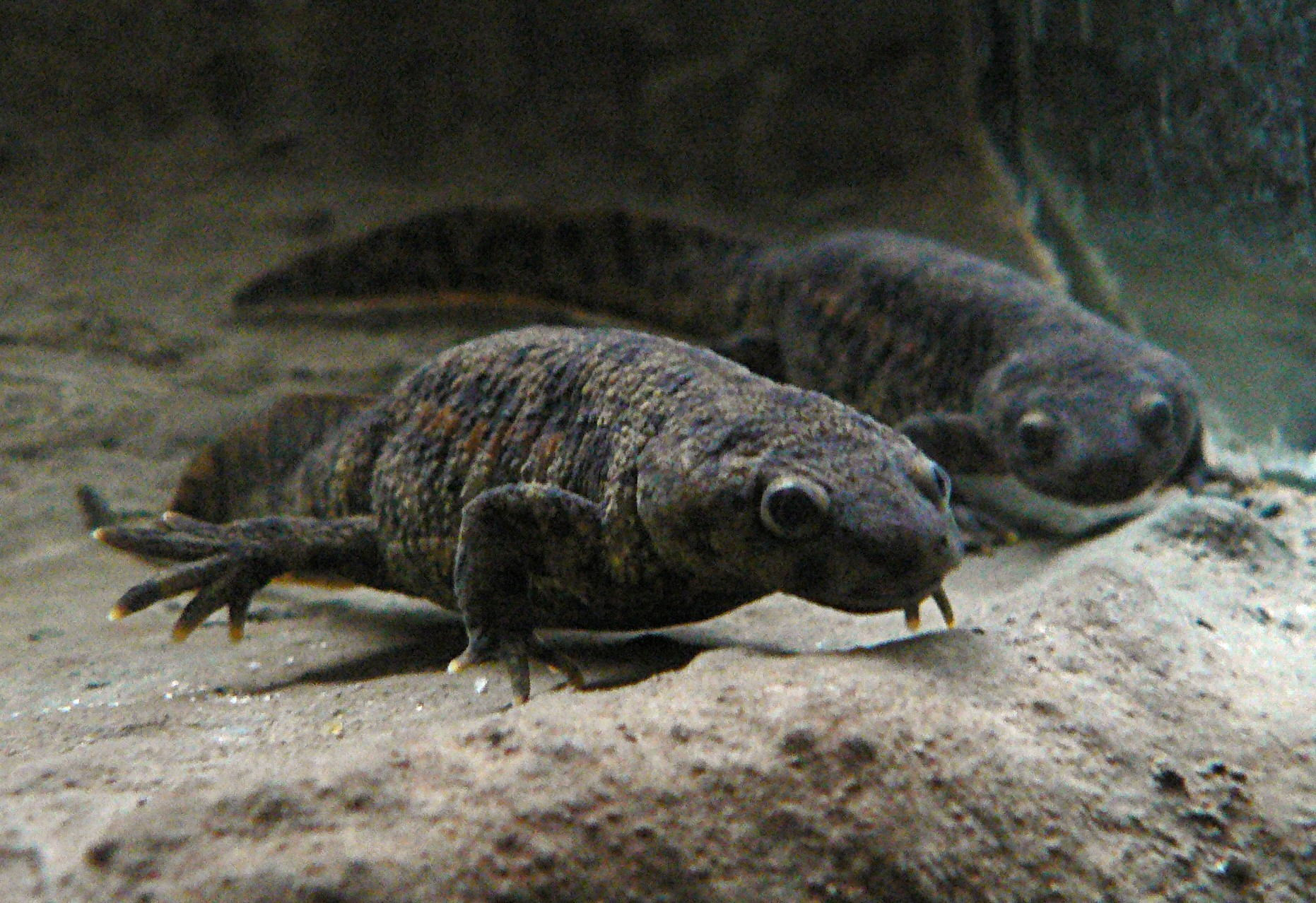
Iberian ribbed newts in an aquarium (on Earth)

The Iberian ribbed newt was chosen because it is a good model organism for the study of microgravity. It is a good model organism because of the female's ability to retain live sperm in her cloaca for up to five months, allowing her to be inseminated on Earth, and later (in space) have fertilisation induced through hormonal stimulation. Another advantage to this species is that its development is slow; so all the key stages of ontogenesis can be observed, from the oocyte to swimming tailbud embryos or larvae.

Studies looked at the Iberian ribbed newt's ability to regenerate (which was faster in space overall, and up to two times as fast in early stages), as well as the stages of development and reproduction in space.

On the ground, studies of hypergravity (up to 3g) on P. waltl fertilisation have also been conducted, as well as on the fertility of the space-born newts once they arrived back on Earth (they were fertile, and without problems).

Similar microgravity experiments have also been conducted for other species, namely the frog species Hyla japonica, and no effects on long term health are similarly observed.

== Regeneration ==
P. waltl is a model organism for the study of adult regeneration. Similar to other salamanders, P. waltl can regenerate lost limbs, injured heart tissue, and lesioned brain cells, in addition to other body parts such as the eye lens and the spinal cord. The 20 Gb genome of P. waltl has been sequenced to facilitate research into the genetic basis of this regenerative ability. Regeneration is able to occur due to the newt's specialized progenitor cells and the transduction of their somatic cells, which act like stem cells. Stem cells repair damaged tissue and contribute to regeneration effects. In most organisms, the efficiency of the function of these stem cells decrease, but in some organisms like P. waltl, this degeneration does not occur. It has been shown that during lens regeneration in P. waltl, they upregulate their DNA repair and ROS-related genes.

To study the lens regeneration of P. waltl, the eye lens is removed in a surgery called a lentectomy. After the lens is removed, new lens epithelial cells start to differentiate and result in the growth of secondary lens fibers that surround the primary lens fibers. What is unique about P. waltl lens regeneration is that the newly formed lens fiber has different organelle composition compared to the primary lens fiber. This results in different scattering properties, but does not effect the regeneration abilities. After the lens has finished regenerating, it separates from the dorsal iris and moves to the position of the original iris, which is a necessary step to allow the newt to regain functional vision. While aging does not effect the regeneration capacity of P. waltl, it does effect the regeneration processes and timeline. The newt larvae regenerate the eye lens in a shorter time period in comparison to juvenile and adult newts.

== See also ==
- List of Mir Expeditions
- Animals in space
