= Bion-M No.2 =

Russian space mission

Bion-M No. 2
- Names: Бион-М
- Mission type: Biological research
- Operator: Institute of Biomedical Problems; Russian Academy of Sciences
- COSPAR ID: 2025-181A
- SATCAT no.: 65265
- Mission duration: 30 days

Spacecraft properties
- Spacecraft: Bion-M No.2
- Spacecraft type: Bion
- Bus: Zenit (bus); Yantar (propulsion)
- Manufacturer: RKTs Progress
- Launch mass: 6,300 kg (13,900 lb)

Start of mission
- Launch date: August 20, 2025
- Rocket: Soyuz 2.1b
- Launch site: Baikonur, Site 31/6
- Contractor: RKTs Progress

End of mission
- Landing date: September 19, 2025
- Landing site: Orenburg region

Orbital parameters
- Reference system: Geocentric orbit
- Regime: Low Earth orbit
- Perigee altitude: 362.8 km (225.4 mi)
- Apogee altitude: 381.2 km (236.9 mi)
- Inclination: 96.9 °
- Period: 91.8 minutes

Bion-M No.2 (Russian: Бион-М) was a Russian space mission, part of the Bion programme focused on space medicine. This second generation Bion-M continues the biological research in space. The prior spacecraft in the series, Bion-M No.1, was launched in 2013. The Bion-M spacecraft are designed to carry biological, physiological and biotechnological experiments to low Earth orbit and return them to Earth at the end of the mission.

== Satellite description ==
The satellite had components from two long-standing Soviet spy satellite families. The landing unit was from the Zenit 2M satellite and the satellite also carried an instrument section developed for the Yantar satellite. The satellite was made by TsSKB Progress of Samara, Russia.

== Launch and recovery ==
The space capsule carrying 75 mice and 1,500 flies was launched into orbit by a Soyuz-2.1b launch vehicle from Baikonur Cosmodrome, Kazakhstan on August 20, 2025 at 8:13 P.M. Moscow Time (17:13 UTC).

The capsule landed "in steppes of the Orenburg region" on September 19, 2025, after spending 30 days in orbit. Photos of the site suggest the landing caused a small brush fire, which was extinguished before recovery crews approached the site. Three helicopters brought experts to the site, who quickly extracted the specimens inside, to begin an examination. The biological specimens were examined in a medical tent on-site, before returning to institute of Biomedical Problems of the Russian Academy of Sciences (IBMP) site in Moscow at around midnight on September 20. 10 mice did not survive the flight; scientists were reportedly satisfied with the results.

== See also ==
- Effect of spaceflight on the human body
