= Kosmos 936 =

Soviet biological science spacecraft (Bion 4)

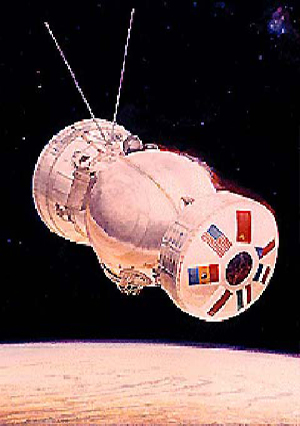
- Conception of Bion 4 in orbit
- Names: Bion 4 Biocosmos 4
- Mission type: Bioscience
- Operator: Institute of Biomedical Problems
- COSPAR ID: 1977-074A
- SATCAT no.: 10172
- Mission duration: 18 days, 11 hours and 4 minutes

Spacecraft properties
- Spacecraft type: Bion
- Bus: Zenit 12KS
- Manufacturer: TsSKB
- Launch mass: 4,000 kg (8,800 lb)

Start of mission
- Launch date: 3 August 1977, 14:01:00 UTC
- Rocket: Soyuz-U
- Launch site: Plesetsk 43/3
- Contractor: TsSKB

End of mission
- Recovered by: Soviet Space Forces
- Landing date: 22 August 1977, 01:05 UTC
- Landing site: 51°53′N 61°30′E near Kustanay, Kazakhstan, USSR

Orbital parameters
- Reference system: Geocentric
- Regime: Low Earth orbit
- Perigee altitude: 224 km (139 mi)
- Apogee altitude: 419 km (260 mi)
- Inclination: 62.80°
- Period: 90.70 min

Kosmos 936 or Bion 4 (Бион 4, Космос 936) was a Bion satellite. The mission involved nine countries in a series of biomedical research experiments. The experiments were primarily follow-ups to the Bion 3 (Kosmos 782) flight. Scientists from the Bulgaria, Czechoslovakia, East Germany, France, Hungary, Poland, Romania, the United States and the Soviet Union conducted experiments in physics and biology on the mission.

== Spacecraft ==
The spacecraft was based on the Zenit reconnaissance satellite and launches began in 1973 with primary emphasis on the problems of radiation effects on human beings. Launches in the program included Kosmos 110, 605, 670, 782, plus Nauka modules flown on Zenit-2M reconnaissance satellites. 90 kg of equipment could be contained in the external Nauka module.

== Launch ==
Kosmos 936 was launched on 3 August 1977, at 14:01:00 UTC by a Soyuz-U launch vehicle from Plesetsk Cosmodrome. The mission ended after 19.5 days.

== Mission ==
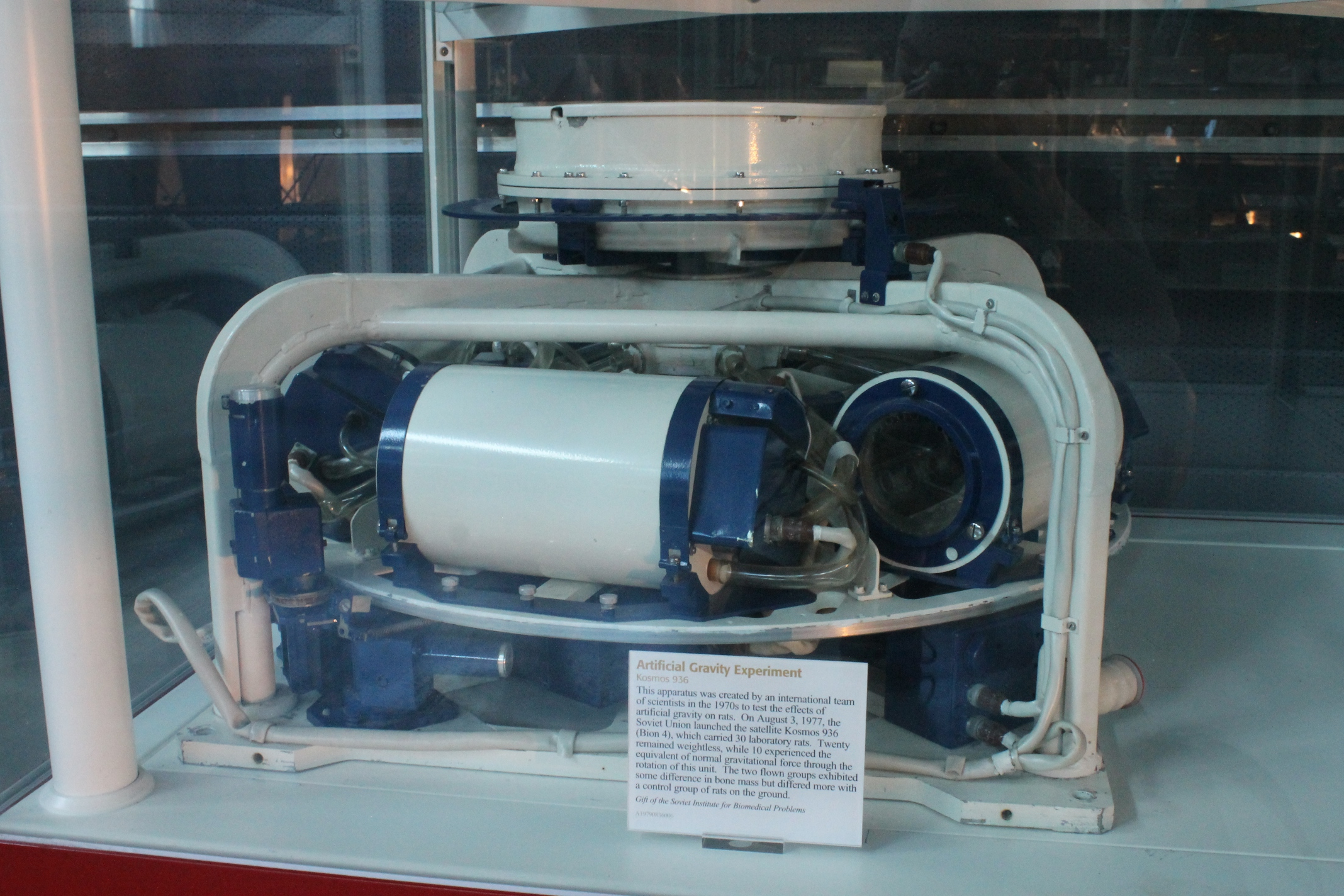
Artificial gravity experiment that was flown on Bion 4.

The mission was to conduct various biological studies, continuing the Bion 3 mission experiments. He had two centrifuges on board to put some specimens in an artificial gravity environment. An attempt was made to differentiate, using rats, between the effects caused by space flight itself from those caused by stress. The effects of flight on muscle and bone, on red cell survival, and on lipid and carbohydrate metabolism were also studied, and an experiment with rats on the effects of space radiation on the retina was conducted.

One of the instruments (without a biological part) studied the physical parameters of the components of space radiation. Fruit flies were used in genetics and aging studies. A group of rats of the Rattus norvegicus species were sent, with an average weight of 215 g (7.6 oz) at launch and 62 days of age. Twenty of the rats experienced microgravity and the other ten were subjected to the artificial gravity of the centrifuge.

== See also ==
- 1977 in spaceflight

== Bibliography ==
- Kozlov, D. I. (1996), Mashnostroenie, ed., Konstruirovanie avtomaticheskikh kosmicheskikh apparatov, Moscow, ISBN
- Melnik, T. G. (1997), Nauka, ed., Voenno-Kosmicheskiy Sili, Moscow, ISBN
- "Bion' nuzhen lyudyam", Novosti Kosmonavtiki, (6): 35, 1996
