= Kosmos (satellite) =

Series of Soviet and Russian military satellites

Kosmos (Russian: Космос, IPA: [ˈkosməs], meaning '(outer) space') is a designation given to many satellites operated by the Soviet Union and subsequently Russia. Kosmos 1, the first spacecraft to be given a Kosmos designation, was launched on 16 March 1962.

== History ==
The first Soviet satellites orbiting Earth were named Sputnik, Polyot (starting in 1963), Elektron (in 1964), Proton (in 1965), and Molniya (in 1965), but most have been called Kosmos since Kosmos 1 on 16 March 1962. The program has included uncrewed tests of crewed spacecraft and satellites for scientific research and military purposes. As of January 2021, 2548 Kosmos satellites have been launched. The spacecraft do not form a single programme, but instead consist of almost all Soviet and Russian military satellites, as well as a number of scientific satellites, and spacecraft which failed during or immediately after launch, but still reached orbit.

Most Soviet and subsequently Russian military satellites were given Kosmos designations. Spacecraft include optical reconnaissance satellites, communications satellites, early warning missile defence spacecraft, nuclear-powered radar reconnaissance satellites, anti-satellite weapons and their targets, navigation satellites and technology demonstrators. Some scientific spacecraft such as Dnepropetrovsk Sputnik, Bion and Meteor satellites were also given Kosmos designations.

The designation is given only to satellites which are in Earth orbit. Typically, Soviet Lunar and planetary missions were initially put into a low Earth parking orbit along with an upper stage, which would later burn for around four minutes to place the spacecraft into a cislunar or a heliocentric orbit. If the engine misfired or the burn was not completed, the probes which would be left in Earth orbit would be given a Kosmos designation.

Control systems for 152 spacecraft which were later assigned Kosmos designations were developed and manufactured by NPO Electropribor (Kharkiv).

== Early Kosmos satellites ==
=== Kosmos 1 ===
Kosmos 1, also known as Sputnik 11, was launched on 16 March 1962 at 12:00:00 GMT. Orbital mass 285 kg. It was the first satellite of the Soviet Earth Satellite series. Employed radio instruments in order to study the structure of the ionosphere.

=== Kosmos 2 ===
Kosmos 2, also known as Sputnik 12, was launched on 6 April 1962 at 17:16:00 GMT. Orbital mass 285 kg. It was the second satellite of the Soviet Earth Satellite series. Employed radio instruments in order to study the structure of the ionosphere.

=== Kosmos 3 ===
Kosmos 3, also known as Sputnik 13, was launched on 24 April 1962 at 04:04:00 GMT. Orbital mass 330 kg. It belongs to the Soviet Earth Satellite series. It was used to study the upper layers of the atmosphere, Earth and the outer space. Data was relayed to Earth by a multichannel telemetry systems equipped with space-borne memory units.

=== Kosmos 4 ===
Kosmos 4, also known as Sputnik 14, was launched on 26 April 1962 at 10:04:00 GMT. Orbital mass 4610 kg. It was used to study the upper layers of the atmosphere, Earth and the outer space. It was developed to measure radiation before and after nuclear tests conducted during the U.S. project Starfish. Data was relayed to Earth by a multichannel telemetry systems equipped with space-borne memory units.

=== Kosmos 5 ===
Kosmos 5, also known as Sputnik 15, was launched on 28 May 1962 at 03:07:00 GMT. Orbital mass 280 kg. It was used to study the upper layers of the atmosphere, Earth and the outer space. Data was relayed to Earth by a multichannel telemetry systems equipped with space-borne memory units.

=== Kosmos 6 ===
Kosmos 6, also known as Sputnik 16, was launched on 30 June 1962 at 16:04:00 GMT from Kapustin Yar. Orbital mass 355 kg. It was a Soviet DS (Dnepropetrovsk Sputnik) type military satellite built in Ukraine for launch by Kosmos launch vehicles. It was used for military and scientific research and component proving tests.

=== Kosmos 7 ===
Kosmos 7, also known as Sputnik 17, was launched on 28 July 1962 at 09:21:00 GMT. Orbital mass 4610 kg. It was used to study the upper layers of the atmosphere, Earth and the outer space. Data was relayed to Earth by a multichannel telemetry systems equipped with space-borne memory units. It was used to measure radiation in the space environment in order to guarantee safety during the flight of the Vostok 3 and Vostok 4 spacecraft.

=== Kosmos 8 ===
Kosmos 8, also known as Sputnik 18, was launched on 18 August 1962 at 05:02:00 GMT from Kapustin Yar. Orbital mass 337 kg. It was a Soviet DS (Dnepropetrovsk Sputnik) type military satellite built in Ukraine for launch by Kosmos launch vehicles. It was used for military and scientific research and component proving tests.

== Other notable Kosmos satellites ==
- Kosmos 21 - failed Venus (Venera) probe mission
- Kosmos 24 - failed Venus probe mission
- Kosmos 47 - first uncrewed test flight of Voskhod crewed spacecraft
- Kosmos 57 - second uncrewed test flight of Voskhod crewed spacecraft
- Kosmos 60 - failed Moon (Luna) landing probe mission
- Kosmos 96 - failed Venus landing probe mission
- Kosmos 110 - first Soviet biosatellite (contained biological experiments)
- Kosmos 111 - failed first Moon orbiting mission
- Kosmos 122 - first Soviet meteorological satellite
- Kosmos 133 - first uncrewed test flight of Soyuz crewed spacecraft
- Kosmos 140 - second uncrewed test flight of Soyuz crewed spacecraft
- Kosmos 144 - a soviet meteorology satellite that predated the Meteor program
- Kosmos 146 - first uncrewed flight of planned crewed L1 Moon-flyby spacecraft
- Kosmos 154 - second uncrewed flight of planned crewed L1 Moon-flyby spacecraft
- Kosmos 156 - a soviet satellite that predated the Meteor program
- Kosmos 159 - failed probe satellite to test gravitational anomalies caused by the Moon
- Kosmos 167 - failed Venus landing probe mission
- Kosmos 186 and 188 - uncrewed test flights of Soyuz crewed spacecraft, the first ever automatic docking of satellites
- Kosmos 212 and Kosmos 213 - uncrewed test flights of Soyuz crewed spacecraft with second automatic docking
- Kosmos 238 - final test series of Soyuz programme spacecraft
- Kosmos 300 - failed Moon sample return mission
- Kosmos 305 - failed Moon sample return mission
- Kosmos 359 - failed Venus landing probe mission
- Kosmos 367 - one of the first launched satellite with an onboard nuclear reactor US-A
- Kosmos 382 - first uncrewed flight of prototype of planned LOK Moon-orbital spacecraft of L3 crewed Moon landing program
- Kosmos 419 - failed Mars orbiting probe mission
- Kosmos 482 - failed Venus landing probe mission, parts crashed in south New Zealand.
- Kosmos 557 - failed third DOS type space station in the Salyut program
- Kosmos 605 - first of the Bion series, containing biological organisms
- Kosmos 638 - first uncrewed test flight of Soyuz/7K-TM crewed spacecraft for Apollo–Soyuz Test Project (ASTP)
- Kosmos 670 - first uncrewed test flight of Soyuz/7K-S military crewed spacecraft
- Kosmos 638 - second uncrewed test flight of Soyuz/7K-TM crewed spacecraft for ASTP
- Kosmos 772 - second uncrewed test flight of Soyuz/7K-S military crewed spacecraft
- Kosmos 782 - first mission in which the U.S. participated in the Soviet Kosmos program
- Kosmos 869 - third uncrewed test flight of Soyuz/7K-S military crewed spacecraft
- Kosmos 929 - first uncrewed flight of planned crewed TKS spacecraft
- Kosmos 954 - launched with an onboard nuclear US-A reactor; failed (reasons uncertain) and re-entered atmosphere on 24 January 1978, strewing radioactive debris across northern Canada
- Kosmos 1001 - first uncrewed test flight of Soyuz-T crewed spacecraft
- Kosmos 1074 - second uncrewed test flight of Soyuz-T crewed spacecraft
- Kosmos 1267 - second flight of TKS spacecraft
- Kosmos 1275 - believed to be the first spacecraft destroyed by space debris, but this is unconfirmed and there are other theories to explain its break up.
- Kosmos 1374 - first flight of BOR-4 prototype of Spiral military shuttle system
- Kosmos 1375 - target satellite launched in Jun 1982 and intercepted and destroyed by Kosmos 1379 a few weeks later.
- Kosmos 1378 - ELINT satellite
- Kosmos 1402 - failed
- Kosmos 1408 - destroyed in an anti-satellite weapon test
- Kosmos 1443 - third flight of TKS spacecraft
- Kosmos 1445 - second flight of BOR-4 prototype of Spiral military shuttle system
- Kosmos 1517 - third flight of BOR-4 prototype of Spiral military shuttle system
- Kosmos 1614 - fourth flight of BOR-4 prototype of Spiral military shuttle system
- Kosmos 1669 - control-restored flight of Progress cargo spacecraft
- Kosmos 1686 - fourth flight of TKS spacecraft
- Kosmos 1818 - first RORSAT with Topaz-1 nuclear reactor
- Kosmos 1867 - second RORSAT with Topaz-1 nuclear reactor
- Kosmos 1870 - uncrewed flight of Almaz military station
- Kosmos 2251 - collided with an Iridium satellite
- Kosmos 2441 - first in a new series of spy satellites (Persona), features updated imaging technology and an extended lifetime of up to seven years, failed
- Kosmos 2479 - last Oko US-KMO early warning satellite, launched on last Proton-K launch vehicle.
- Kosmos 2480 - Kobalt-M spy satellite, launched aboard the last Soyuz-U launch vehicle from Plesetsk Cosmodrome.

== See also ==
- Russian space program
- Bion (satellite)
