= Kosmos 1667 =

Soviet spacecraft aimed at biological experiments in space

Kosmos 1667 / Bion 7
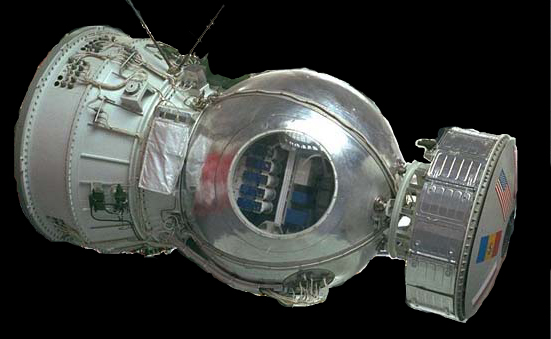
- A Bion spacecraft
- Names: Bion 7 Biocosmos 7 Biokosmos 7
- Mission type: Bioscience
- Operator: Institute of Biomedical Problems
- COSPAR ID: 1985-059A
- SATCAT no.: 15891
- Mission duration: 7 days

Spacecraft properties
- Spacecraft: Bion 7
- Spacecraft type: Bion
- Manufacturer: TsSKB
- Launch mass: 5,700 kg (12,600 lb)

Start of mission
- Launch date: 10 July 1985, 03:15:00 UTC
- Rocket: Soyuz-U 11A511U s/n B15000-453
- Launch site: Plesetsk, Site 41/1
- Contractor: TsSKB

End of mission
- Recovered by: Soviet Space Forces
- Landing date: 17 July 1985, 00:00 UTC
- Landing site: Kazakhstan, Soviet Union

Orbital parameters
- Reference system: Geocentric orbit
- Regime: Low Earth orbit
- Perigee altitude: 222 km (138 mi)
- Apogee altitude: 297 km (185 mi)
- Inclination: 82.30°
- Period: 90.00 minutes

Kosmos 1667 (Russian: Космос 1667 meaning Kosmos 1667), or Bion 7 was a 1985 biomedical research mission satellite involving scientists from nine countries. It was part of the Bion program. This mission was the scientific participation of nine countries (Bulgaria, Czechoslovakia, East Germany, France, Hungary, Poland, Romania, Soviet Union and United States).

== Mission ==
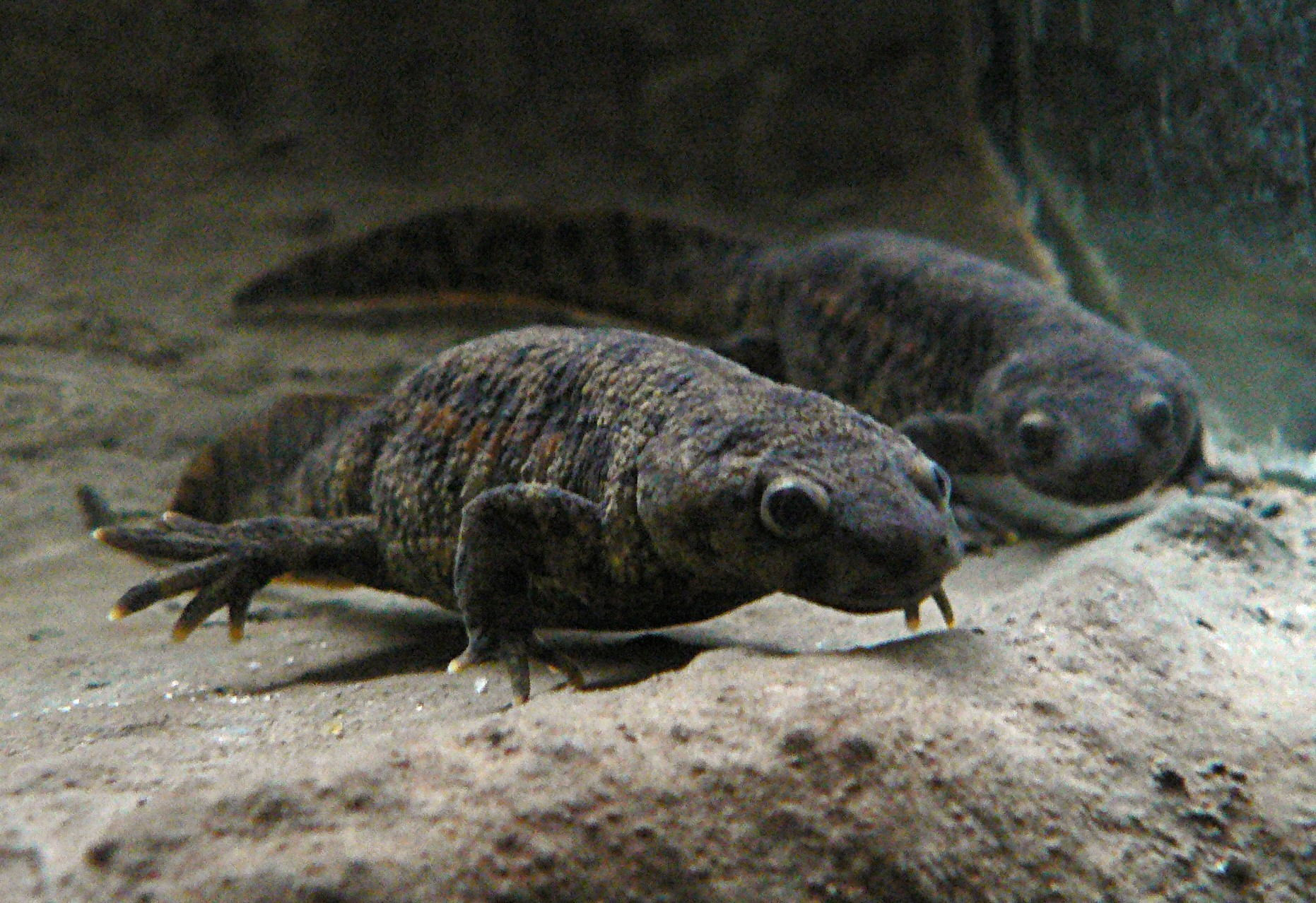
Pleurodeles waltl, the species of newt which orbited the Earth on Kosmos 1667.

Kosmos 1667 was the second U.S.S.R. biosatellite mission with a primate payload. Although the American experiment on the Kosmos 1667 mission was meant to be a repeat of the Kosmos 1514 cardiovascular experiment, several improvements were implemented on this mission. Modified post-surgery animal handling procedures minimised the risk of damaging the transducer implants. Data was sampled and recorded more frequently during the inflight period. Two monkeys with flight-type cardiovascular instrumentation were studied in a ground-based synchronous control experiment; postflight cardiovascular tests were not conducted after Kosmos 1514. Postural tilt tests were conducted during the pre-flight and post-flight periods in several animals to establish a ground-based pool of normal data for this procedure. This data was compared with the similar body fluid shifts thought to occur in flight. Instrument calibration procedures were modified on this mission to ensure that blood pressure measurements would be accurate.

The main objective of American participation in the Kosmos 1667 mission was to measure carotid artery pressure and blood flow during the inflight period. The United States provided all flight and ground support instrumentation for this experiment. Raw analogue data from flight and ground control experiments was transferred to the Cardiovascular Research Laboratory at the NASA Ames Research Center for analysis. Hemodynamic data was to be correlated with concurrently recorded Soviet data. A similar correlative study was performed during the Cosmos 1514 mission, where blood flow velocity was compared to total body cardiac output as determined by impedance cardiography. Two rhesus macaques (Macaca mulatta) named Gordyy and Oomka were flown on board the biosatellite. Each animal weighed approximately 4 kg (8.8 lb). Both were instrumented for Soviet neurophysiology studies. The instruments consisted of bilaterally implanted microelectrodes in the vestibular nuclei, and electro-oculogram and electroencephalogram electrodes. Monkeys were housed in Soviet biosatellite capsules, as for the Kosmos 1514 mission. United States hardware developed for the Kosmos 1514 cardiovascular experiment was used again on this mission. A barometric pressure recorder mounted in the primate capsule was used to correct and normalise the implanted pressure sensor to 760 mm Hg.

They were also taken ten male rats, and ten newts. The newts had part of their front limbs amputated and their crystalline lenses removed to study the possible rate of human recovery from injuries incurred in space. A biocalorimeter monitored energy exchange during the emergence of flies from nymphs; 1500 drosophila flies were carried for this purpose. The payload also included maize seeds, crocuses, and guppies in an aquarium.

The mission was recovered after seven days. on 17 July 1985.

== See also ==
- 1985 in spaceflight
- Animals in space

== Bibliography ==
- Kozlov, D. I. (1996), Mashnostroenie, ed.; Konstruirovanie avtomaticheskikh kosmicheskikh apparatov, Moscow, ISBN
- Melnik, T. G. (1997), Nauka, ed.; Voenno-Kosmicheskiy Sili, Moscow, ISBN
- "Bion' nuzhen lyudyam", Novosti Kosmonavtiki, (6): 35, 1996
