= Bion-M No.1 =

Russian space mission

Bion-M No. 1
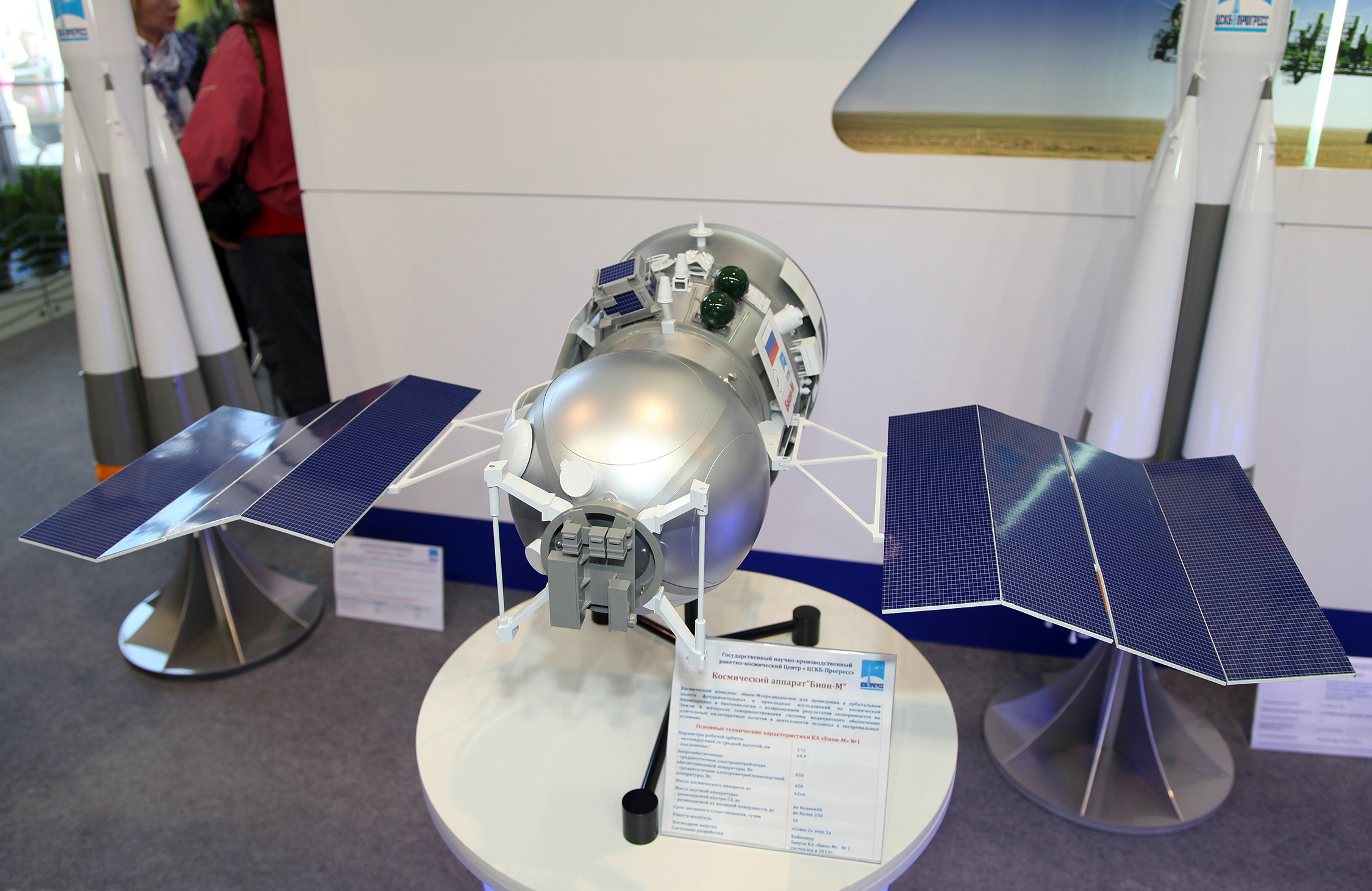
- Bion-M No.1 satellite
- Names: Бион-М
- Mission type: Biological research
- Operator: Institute of Biomedical Problems; Russian Academy of Sciences
- COSPAR ID: 2013-015A
- SATCAT no.: 39130
- Mission duration: 30 days (achieved)

Spacecraft properties
- Spacecraft: Bion-M No.1
- Spacecraft type: Bion-M
- Bus: Zenit (bus); Yantar (propulsion)
- Manufacturer: TsSKB Progress
- Launch mass: 6,266 kg (13,814 lb)
- Landing mass: 2,415 kg (5,324 lb)
- Power: 450 watts

Start of mission
- Launch date: 19 April 2013, 10:00:00 UTC
- Rocket: Soyuz 2-1a
- Launch site: Baikonur, Site 31/6
- Contractor: Progress Rocket Space Centre

End of mission
- Recovered by: Russian Space Forces
- Landing date: 19 May 2013, 03:12 UTC
- Landing site: 51°53′N 54°20′E; Orenburg, Russia

Orbital parameters
- Reference system: Geocentric orbit
- Regime: Low Earth orbit
- Perigee altitude: 471 km (293 mi)
- Apogee altitude: 579 km (360 mi)
- Inclination: 64.87°
- Period: 90.0 minutes
- Revolution no.: 444

Bion-M No.1 (Russian: Бион-М) was a Russian space mission, part of the Bion-M programme focused on space medicine. The new generation Bion-M continued the Soviet/Russian Bion satellite programme aimed at biological research in space. The last spacecraft of the Bion series, Bion 11, was launched in 1996. The Bion-M1 spacecraft was designed to carry biological, physiological and biotechnological experiments to low Earth orbit and return them to Earth at the end of the mission. The biological payload for Bion-M1 included rodents, amphibians, reptiles, crustaceans, mollusks, fish, insects, bacteria, plant and animal cell cultures. The spacecraft was the result of collaboration hosting biomedical payloads provided by scientific institutions from the United States, Germany, Canada, the Netherlands, Poland and other countries. The Bion-M automated spacecraft was a unique specialized space complex that aimed to determine the fundamental mechanisms of how life adapts to microgravity and then readapts to Earth-normal gravity.

== Launch and return ==
The animal-carrying space capsule was launched into orbit on 19 April 2013, from Baikonur Cosmodrome, Kazakhstan. The Bion-M flew a 30-day mission. The satellite was launched in a ride-share along with 6 small satellites - OSSI-1, Dove-2, AIST 2, BEESat 3, SOMP and BEESat 2.

Return to Earth was on 19 May 2013 with a landing near Orenburg in Russia at 03:12 UTC.

== Satellite description ==
The satellite had components from two long-standing Soviet spy satellite families. Bion's landing unit was from the Zenit 2M satellite and the satellite also carried an instrument section developed for the Yantar satellite. The satellite was made by TsSKB Progress of Samara, Russia.

The cargo consisted of 45 mice (three per cage), 15 geckos, eight Mongolian gerbils, snails, and fish. The animals were intended to survive the entire mission, but upon landing it was found that all gerbils, most of the 45 mice, and all of the fish were dead due to equipment failure. Fifteen of the mice died when the food dispenser in their experimental compartment stopped working. The gerbil compartment suffered a temporary loss of power, ventilation, lighting, and food supply that likely accounts for their demise. Ultimately, all of the remaining animals were euthanized for study. The Bion-M No.1 mission was managed by Roscosmos, but scientists from the United States, Germany, Canada, Poland, the Netherlands and other countries also participated in the experiments.

Organism	Number sent	Number survived	Cause of death
Mongolian gerbils (Meriones ungviculatus)	8	all died	Equipment failure
mice (Mus musculus) (C57black/6)	45	16	food supply failure (15), stress
geckos (Chondrodactylus turneri Gray)	15	survived	
fish (Oreochromis mossambicus)		all died	Equipment failure
snails (Helix pomatia Linnaeus)	20	survived	
other, including microorganisms		survived	

== Research ==
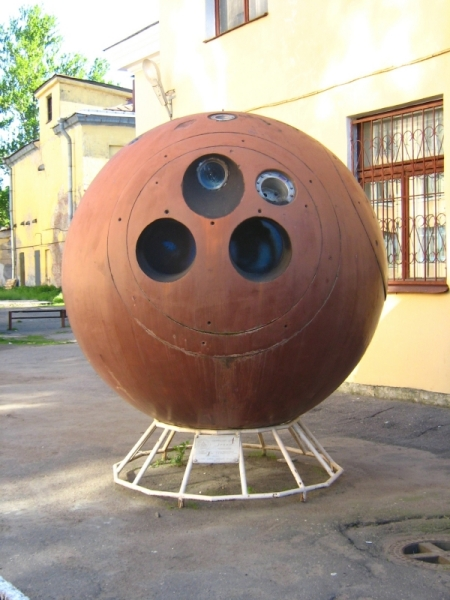
Example of a Zenit landing vehicle.

Research on the recovered animals revealed insights into the impact of spaceflight on cerebral arteries, the spinal cord, inner ear, and genetic processes. Deputy Director of Russia's Institute of Medical and Biological Studies Vladimir Sychev indicated that some of the results may help explain why some astronauts suffer impaired vision during spaceflight: "We used to think that in zero-gravity, fluid travelled upward and that the quality of blood improved, but it turns out that it is the other way around. The arteries of the brain come under duress and their capacity is reduced by 40 percent [sic]." The reduced bloodflow may be key to triggering orthostatic intolerance.

== See also ==
- 2013 in spaceflight
- Effect of spaceflight on the human body
- Space medicine
