= Kosmos 1129 =

Soviet biological science spacecraft (Bion 5)

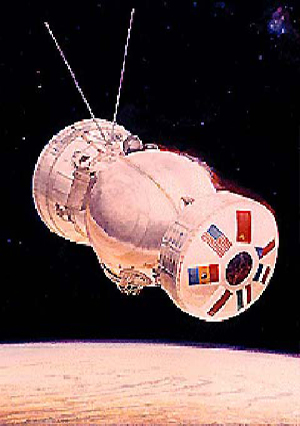
- Conception of Bion 5 in orbit
- Names: Bion-5; Biocosmos 5
- Mission type: Bioscience
- Operator: Institute of Biomedical Problems
- COSPAR ID: 1979-083A
- SATCAT no.: 11536
- Mission duration: 14 days, 10 hours and 54 minutes

Spacecraft properties
- Spacecraft type: Bion
- Bus: Zenit 12KS
- Manufacturer: TsSKB
- Launch mass: 6,000 kg (13,000 lb)

Start of mission
- Launch date: 29 September 1979, 15:30:00 UTC
- Rocket: Soyuz-U
- Launch site: Plesetsk 41/1
- Contractor: TsSKB

End of mission
- Recovered by: Soviet Space Forces
- Landing date: 14 October 1979, 02:24 UTC
- Landing site: 52°17′N 65°30′E near Oktyabr'skoe, Kazakhstan, USSR

Orbital parameters
- Reference system: Geocentric
- Regime: Low Earth orbit
- Perigee altitude: 226 km (140 mi)
- Apogee altitude: 406 km (252 mi)
- Inclination: 62.80°
- Period: 90.50 minutes

Bion 5, also known as Kosmos 1129 (in Russian: Бион 5, Космос-1129) was a Bion satellite. It was an international biomedical research mission involving scientists from nine countries, launched on 29 September 1979, at 15:30:00 UTC. Among the experiments was the first attempt to breed mammals in space, which proved unsuccessful. The mission ended after 14.5 days, on 14 October 1979, at 02:24 UTC. The mission had the cooperation of the Bulgaria, Czechoslovakia, East Germany, France, Hungary, Poland, Romania, the United States and the Soviet Union.

== Mission ==
Organisms studied included:

- Rattus norvegicus (Wistar rat)
- Coturnix coturnix (Japanese quail)
- Daucus carota (carrot)

== Objectives ==
Bion 5 mission consisted of various biological studies, including the first mammalian reproduction attempts (rats) in space, which ended up not succeeding. Experiences NASA were designed to study the effects of radiation on mice, quail embryos and some plant specimens.

Studies on the effect of microgravity were also performed on the muscles and bones of rats and avian embryogenesis was studied in space. the effects of microgravity on plant tissues were investigated using carrots and carrot cancerous tissue to study the effects of space flight on the growth and development of plants. As in the previous mission, 30 rats for the species Rattus norvegicus were sent physiological studies; Seven additional rats were used in embryological experiments.

== See also ==
- 1979 in spaceflight

== Bibliography ==
- Kozlov, D. I. (1996), Mashnostroenie, ed.; Konstruirovanie avtomaticheskikh kosmicheskikh apparatov, Moscow, ISBN
- Melnik, T. G. (1997), Nauka, ed.; Voenno-Kosmicheskiy Sili, Moscow, ISBN
- "Bion' nuzhen lyudyam", Novosti Kosmonavtiki, (6): 35, 1996
