= OSSI-1 =

Geocentric radio satellite

- Mission type: Research/amateur radio
- COSPAR ID: 2013-015B
- SATCAT no.: 39131
- Website: http://opensat.cc/ (archived)

Spacecraft properties
- Spacecraft type: 1U CubeSat
- Manufacturer: Home made
- Launch mass: 950g
- Dimensions: 10 centimetres (3.9 in) cube

Start of mission
- Launch date: 19 April 2013, 10:00 UTC
- Rocket: Soyuz 2-1a
- Launch site: Baikonur 31/6
- Contractor: Roskosmos

End of mission
- Decay date: 30 June 2013

Orbital parameters
- Reference system: Geocentric
- Regime: Low Earth
- Semi-major axis: 6,778 kilometres (4,212 mi)
- Perigee altitude: 263.0 kilometres (163.4 mi)
- Apogee altitude: 552.8 kilometres (343.5 mi)
- Inclination: 64.9 degrees
- Period: 92.6 minutes
- Epoch: 14 May 2013

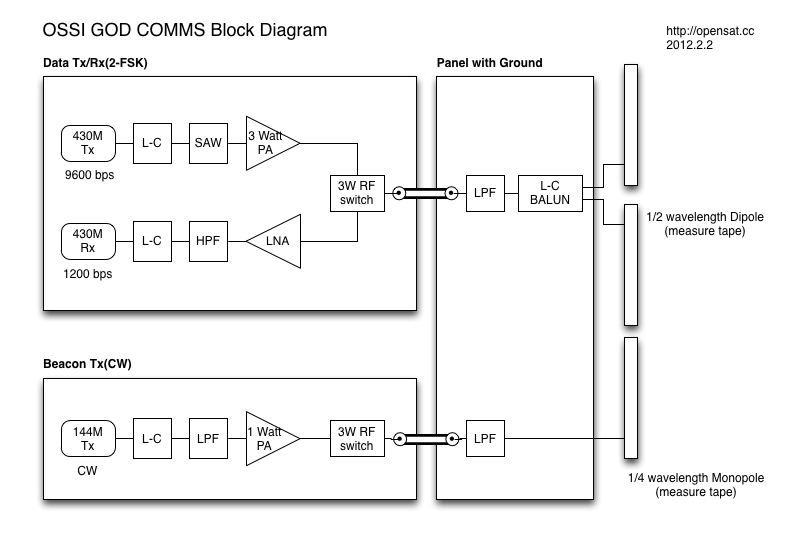
OSSI 1 communications block diagram

OSSI-1 (standing for Open Source Satellite Initiative-1) was an amateur radio satellite launched in 2013 with Bion-M No.1. Bion-M was launched into orbit at 10:00 UTC on April 19, 2013, from Baikonur Cosmodrome, Kazakhstan, with 6 other small satellites, including OSSI-1. OSSI-1 detached from Bion-M at 16:15 UTC.

OSSI-1 is the pet project of Hojun Song, a South Korean artist and amateur radio operator. He worked on it for seven years, designing and building the satellite using off-the-shelf components rather than equipment that had been certified for use in space. The most expensive aspect of the project was the launch, which cost US$100,000.

OSSI-1 was a 1U CubeSat with 100mm sides, weighing 950g. It uses an Arduino microcontroller, a lithium-ion battery and a J mode UHF/VHF transceiver.

The satellite had a Morse code beacon transmitting "OS0 DE OSSI1 ANYOUNG" on 145.980 MHz and 4 LED lights with a total power of 44 watts to flash Morse code messages, using an open protocol. The project developers announced on 24 April 2013 that they had not yet received a signal from the satellite and were concerned that the Two-line element set they were using to locate the satellite might be wrong.

According to Korean amateur radio organisation KARL, Hojun Song had some difficulties launching a satellite as a private individual, connected to registering with space bodies and being allocated broadcast frequencies by the international telecoms regulator the ITU. A law requires knowledge of the launch date two years in advance which he was not able to give as he was sharing a launch with other experimental satellites. The amateur radio bands are nearly full but to use other bands would require more expensive specialist equipment and technical skills. In 2011 OSSI-1 signed a contract with a French nano satellite company for a turnkey launch service in order to secure a launch date.

The satellite re-entered the Earth's atmosphere on 30 June 2013. Source code for the satellite is available on GitHub.
