= Kosmos 1887 =

Soviet spacecraft aimed at biological experiments in space

Kosmos 1887 / Bion 8
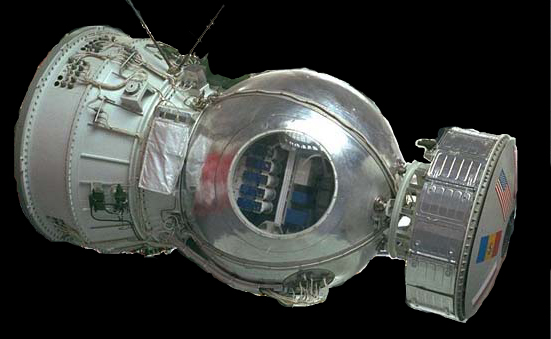
- A Bion spacecraft
- Names: Bion 8 Biocosmos 8 Biokosmos 8
- Mission type: Bioscience
- Operator: Institute for Medical and Biological Problems (IMBP)
- COSPAR ID: 1987-083A
- SATCAT no.: 18380
- Mission duration: 13 days

Spacecraft properties
- Spacecraft: Bion 8
- Spacecraft type: Bion
- Manufacturer: TsSKB
- Launch mass: 6,700 kg (14,800 lb)

Start of mission
- Launch date: 29 September 1987, 12:50:00 UTC
- Rocket: Soyuz-U 11A511U s/n L15000-543
- Launch site: Plesetsk, Site 41/1
- Contractor: TsSKB

End of mission
- Recovered by: Soviet Space Forces
- Landing date: 12 October 1987, 04:05 UTC
- Landing site: 62°47′N 112°26′E; Chernyshevsky, Soviet Russia, Soviet Union

Orbital parameters
- Reference system: Geocentric orbit
- Regime: Low Earth orbit
- Perigee altitude: 224 km (139 mi)
- Apogee altitude: 406 km (252 mi)
- Inclination: 62.80°
- Period: 90.50 minutes

Bion 8 or Kosmos 1887 (in Russian: Бион 8, Космос 1887) was a Bion satellite.

== Mission ==
Bion 8 carried a payload of biological and radiation physics experiments from nine countries. The landing was several hundred miles from the expected recovery site, which resulted in considerable difficulties. The biological payload on the spacecraft included 2 monkeys, 10 rats, fruit flies, grasshoppers, beetles, guppies, Hynobiidae, Chlorella ciliate, newts and corn. More than 50 NASA-sponsored scientists were involved in conducting the 33 American experiments on board.

One of these experiments, a study of radiation levels in the space environment, did not require the use of any biological subjects. The United States conducted only one experiment on the primates flown on the biosatellite. The remaining American experiments were performed on tissue samples from five of the flight rats. A number of these experiments were extensions of the studies conducted on the Spacelab-3 mission in April 1985. The other countries involved in conducting experiments on the mission were the Soviet Union, Poland, Czechoslovakia, the East Germany, France, Romania, Bulgaria and Hungary. The European Space Agency (ESA) also sponsored some experiments. The United States was responsible for developing flight and ground-based hardware, verifying testing of hardware and experiment procedures, developing rat tissue sampling procedures, and transferring tissues and data from the Soviet Union after the flight. One of the mission's noteworthy features was the rat biospecimen sharing program, which allowed a great number of rat tissue samples to be analysed. The objective of the U.S. experiments was to investigate the effect of microgravity on various body systems.

The primate experiment was designed to study the growth and development of the peripheral skeleton. Rat studies encompassed a broad array of disciplines. The effects of microgravity on cardiac, liver, small intestine and bone tissue, liver function, skeletal growth, hormone levels and metabolism were studied using various approaches. Other studies investigated changes in the immune, nervous and reproductive systems, in muscle and connective tissue and in skeletal and mineral homeostasis. Another experiment was conducted to evaluate radiation exposure during the flight and to measure the shielding effectiveness of the spacecraft. Ten 12-week-old male specific pathogen free Wistar rats were flown in the Rodent-BIOS. Two rhesus macaques(Macaca mulatta) named Drema and Yerosha occupied the Primate-BIOS.

== See also ==
- 1987 in spaceflight
- Animals in space
