= Kosmos 1514 =

Soviet biological science spacecraft (Bion 6)

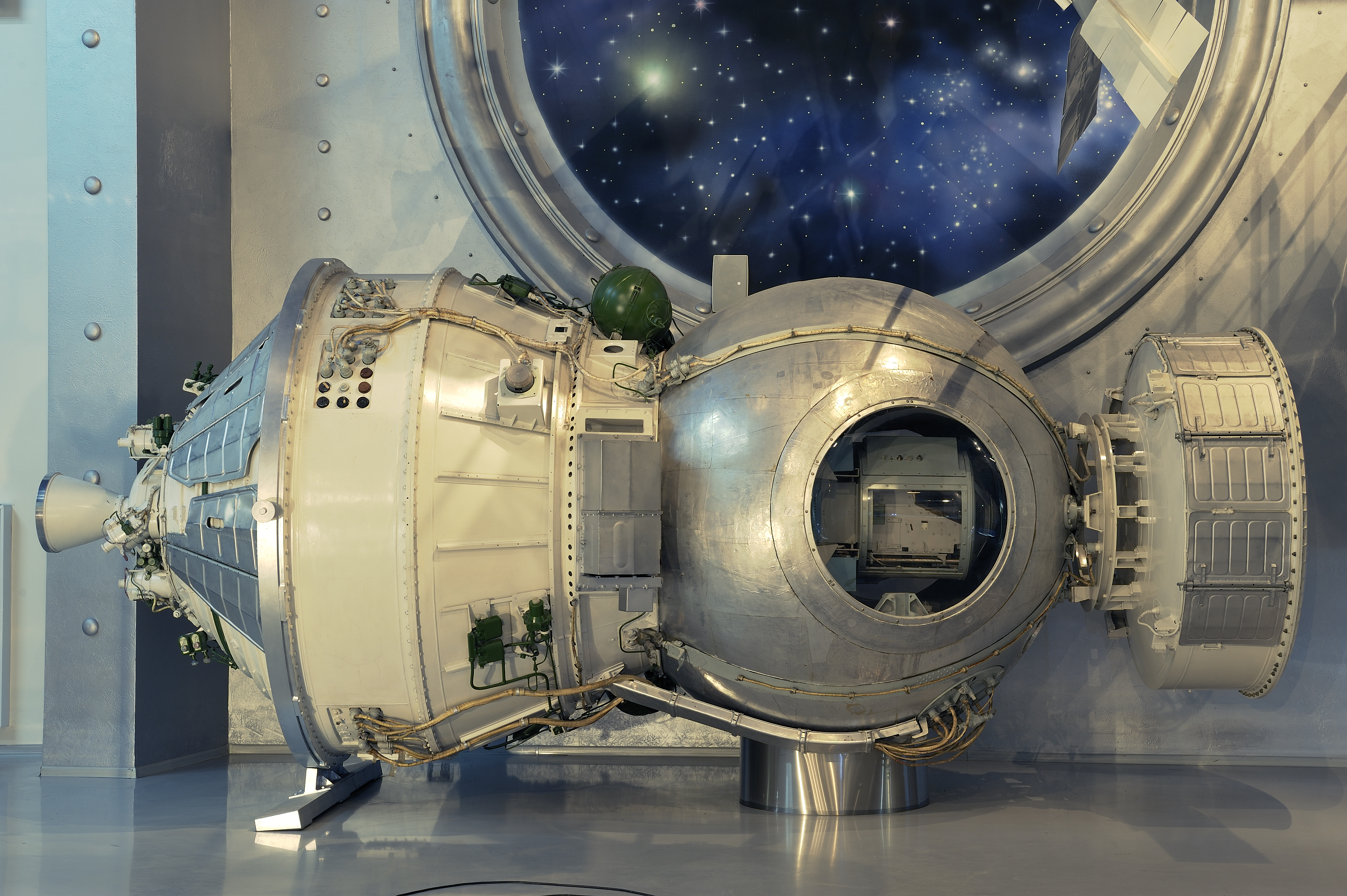
- Names: Bion 6 Biocosmos 6
- Mission type: Bioscience
- Operator: Institute of Biomedical Problems
- COSPAR ID: 1983-121A
- SATCAT no.: 14549
- Mission duration: 4 days, 21 hours and 48 minutes

Spacecraft properties
- Spacecraft type: Bion
- Bus: Zenit 12KS
- Manufacturer: TsSKB
- Launch mass: 5,700 kg (12,600 lb)

Start of mission
- Launch date: 14 December 1983, 07:00:00 UTC
- Rocket: Soyuz-U
- Launch site: Plesetsk 41/1
- Contractor: TsSKB

End of mission
- Recovered by: Soviet Space Forces
- Landing date: 19 December 1983, 04:48 UTC
- Landing site: 52°42′N 62°48′E; Rudny, Kazakhstan, USSR

Orbital parameters
- Reference system: Geocentric
- Regime: Low Earth orbit
- Perigee altitude: 226 km (140 mi)
- Apogee altitude: 288 km (179 mi)
- Inclination: 82.30°
- Period: 89.30 min

Kosmos 1514 or Bion 6 (in Russian: Космос 1514, Бион 6) was a biomedical research mission that was launched on 14 December 1983, at 07:00:00 UTC. It was part of the Bion programme.

== Mission ==
The first Soviet Union orbital flight of a non-human primate was accomplished on the Kosmos 1514 mission. Two monkeys flew on the mission, together with several pregnant rats. More than 60 experiments were performed by investigators from Bulgaria, Hungary, the German Democratic Republic, Poland, Romania, Czechoslovakia, France, the Soviet Union and the United States. This was the first time the Soviet space agency flew monkeys in space, coming 34 years after the U.S. first put a monkey into space, and 22 years after the Soviet Union started putting humans into space.

United States scientists conducted three experiments on the primates and another experiment on the rat subjects. The mission differed markedly from earlier Cosmos flights, both in terms of Soviet scientific goals and in the degree of cooperation required between the United States and the Soviet Union. The two countries had to interact at a high level because much of the U.S. experiment hardware had to be integrated with the Soviet spacecraft and instrumentation systems.

Two Rhesus monkeys were flown into orbit implanted with sensors to permit monitoring of carotid artery blood flow. Additionally eighteen pregnant white rats were sent to be used for studies of the effects of microgravity and radiation. The rats subsequently produced normal litters.

Experiments focused on the effect of weightlessness on various physiological parameters. A study of circadian rhythms was concerned with the synchronization of primate motor activity, body temperature and skin temperature rhythms to a fixed light/dark cycle and to each other. Blood pressure and flow were monitored, to evaluate short and long-term changes in these parameters. Changes in calcium metabolism were studied in order to determine the effect of weightlessness on the skeleton. The two rhesus monkeys (Macaca mulatta), Abrek and Bion, flown on board were about three years of age and each weighed approximately 4 kilograms. Height was a constraint in selecting animals for flight. This was because a Soviet vestibular experiment required that the flight restraint couches oscillate vertically within the animal capsules. The monkeys were conditioned to sit in the restraint couches and perform tasks for food rewards. Tasks included pressing a lever with their feet and tracking a moving light with their eyes. Monkeys were also trained to eat and drink from food and juice dispensers. Monkeys in the flight and control groups were implanted with blood pressure and flow cuffs and sensors to measure several physiological parameters.

A neuroontogeny experiment was conducted to investigate space flight effects on the sensory development of rats that spent part of their prenatal gestation period in space. Ten pregnant female Wistar rats (Rattus norvegicus) were flown. Ground control groups contained the same number of rats. At the start of the flight or control experiments, the rats were at gestation day 13 of their 21-day cycle.

The mission ended after five days, on 19 December 1983.

== See also ==
- 1983 in spaceflight
- Animals in space

== Bibliography ==
- Kozlov, D. I. (1996), Mashnostroenie, ed.; Konstruirovanie avtomaticheskikh kosmicheskikh apparatov, Moscow, ISBN
- Melnik, T. G. (1997), Nauka, ed.; Voenno-Kosmicheskiy Sili, Moscow, ISBN
- "Bion' nuzhen lyudyam", Novosti Kosmonavtiki, (6): 35, 1996
