= Kosmos 605 =

Soviet biological science spacecraft (Bion 1)

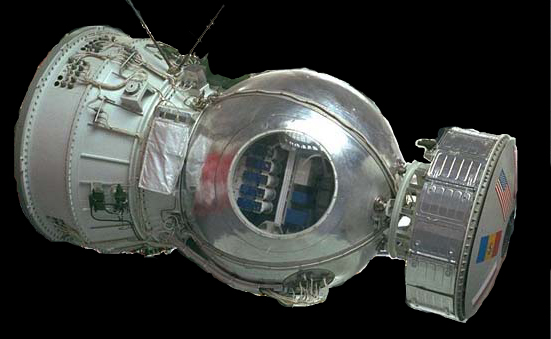
- Names: Bion 1 Biocosmos 1
- Mission type: Bioscience
- Operator: Institute of Biomedical Problems
- COSPAR ID: 1973-083A
- SATCAT no.: 6913
- Mission duration: 21 days, 12 hours and 47 minutes

Spacecraft properties
- Spacecraft type: Bion
- Bus: Zenit 12KS
- Manufacturer: TsSKB
- Launch mass: 5,500 kg (12,100 lb)
- Landing mass: 900 kg (2,000 lb)

Start of mission
- Launch date: 31 October 1973, 18:24:59 UTC
- Rocket: Soyuz-U
- Launch site: Plesetsk 43/3
- Contractor: TsSKB

End of mission
- Disposal: Recovered
- Landing date: 22 November 1973, 07:12 UTC
- Landing site: 53°29′N 65°27′E; Sarykol, Kazakhstan, USSR

Orbital parameters
- Reference system: Geocentric
- Regime: Low Earth orbit
- Perigee altitude: 221 km (137 mi)
- Apogee altitude: 424 km (263 mi)
- Inclination: 62.80°
- Period: 90.70 minutes

Kosmos 605 or Bion 1 (Russian: Космос 605), was a Bion satellite. It was the first of eleven Bion satellites launched between 1973 and 1996.

== Launch ==
Kosmos 605 was launched by a Soyuz-U rocket flying from Site 43/3 at the Plesetsk Cosmodrome in the Soviet Union. The satellite was initially launched in a low Earth orbit with a perigee of 221 km (137 mi) and an apogee of 424 km (263 mi) with an orbital inclination of 62.80° ant an orbital period of 90.70 minutes.

== Mission ==
The spacecraft orbited the Earth for 21 days until its biological capsule returned to Earth on 22 November 1973 in a region of northwestern Kazakhstan. It carried several dozen male rats (possibly 25 or 45), six Russian tortoises (Agrionemys horsfieldii) (each in a separate box), a mushroom bed, flour beetles (Tribolium confusum) in various stages of their life cycle, and living bacterial spores. It provided data on the reaction of mammal, reptile, insect, fungal, and bacterial forms to prolonged weightlessness.

== Results ==
After returning, the animals found several functional changes, such as decreased body temperature, difficulty breathing, muscle atrophy, decreased bone mechanical strength and decreased mass of some internal organs and glands. No pathological changes were found. 3–4 weeks after landing, most of these changes receded and the animals returned to normal. In the experiment, for the first time, a second generation of insects was obtained whose weightlessness was developed. No differences were detected between the second and the first generation. The influence of space conditions on the development of fungi was also found. Growing up in a weightless state, they created a very thin and extremely bent leg and a more massive mycelium than on Earth. Kosmos 605 also tested means of protection against ionizing radiation.

== See also ==
- 1973 in spaceflight

== Bibliography ==
- Kozlov, D. I. (1996), Mashnostroenie, ed.; Konstruirovanie avtomaticheskikh kosmicheskikh apparatov, Moscow, ISBN
- Melnik, T. G. (1997), Nauka, ed.; Voenno-Kosmicheskiy Sili, Moscow, ISBN
- "Bion' nuzhen lyudyam", Novosti Kosmonavtiki, (6): 35, 1996
