= Dmitri Kozlov (engineer) =

Soviet aerospace engineer (1919–2009)

Dr. Dmitry Kozlov
- Дмитрий Ильич Козлов
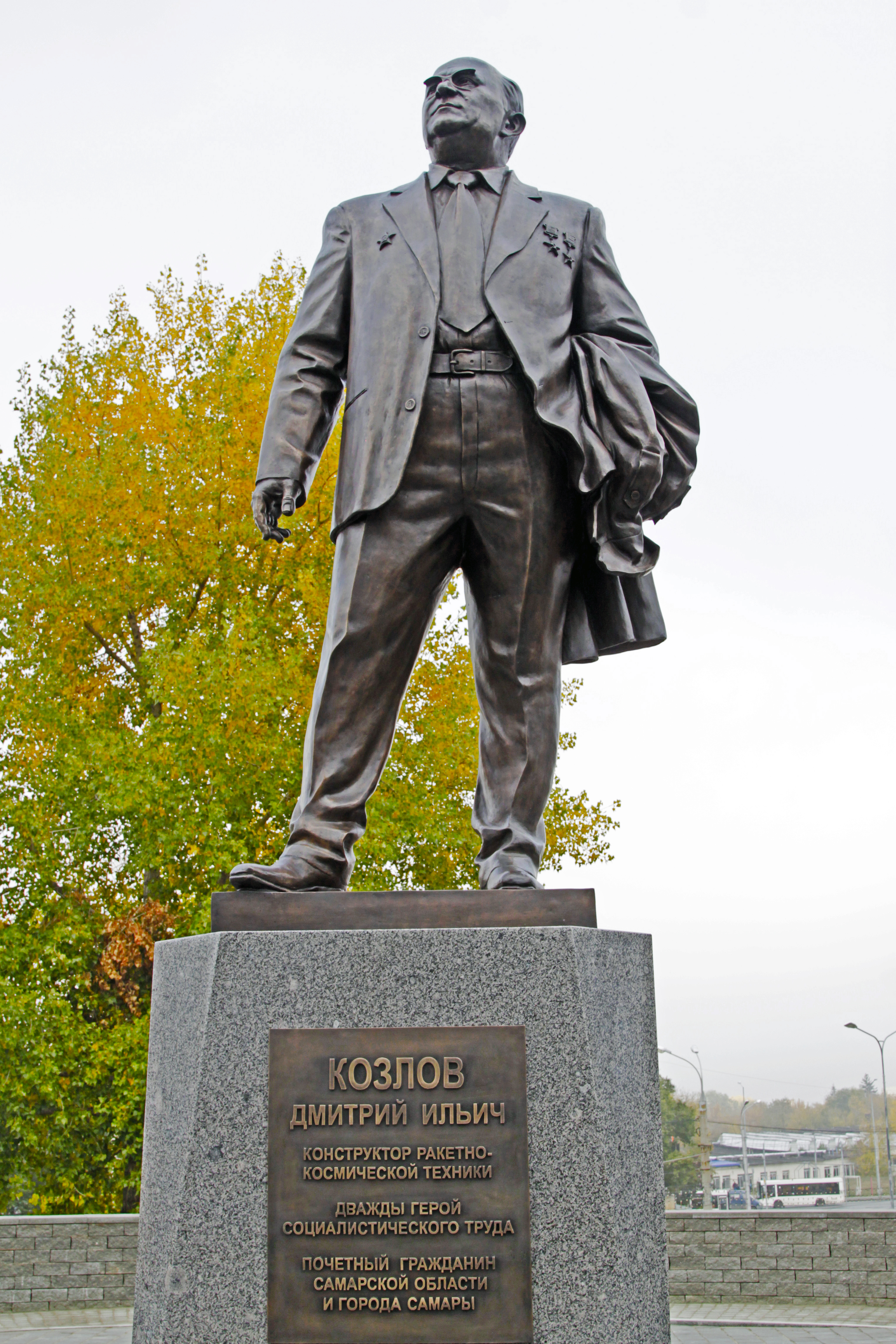
- Bronze monument in memory of D. I. Kozlov (Samara, Russia)
- Born: Dmitry Ilyich Kozlov; October 1, 1919; Tikhoretsk, Russian SFSR, Soviet Union
- Died: March 7, 2009 (aged 89); Samara, Russia
- Education: Leningrad Military Mechanical Institute (PhD, Technical Sciences)
- Occupations: Scientist; Engineer
- Known for: scientist in aerospace engineering

Signature
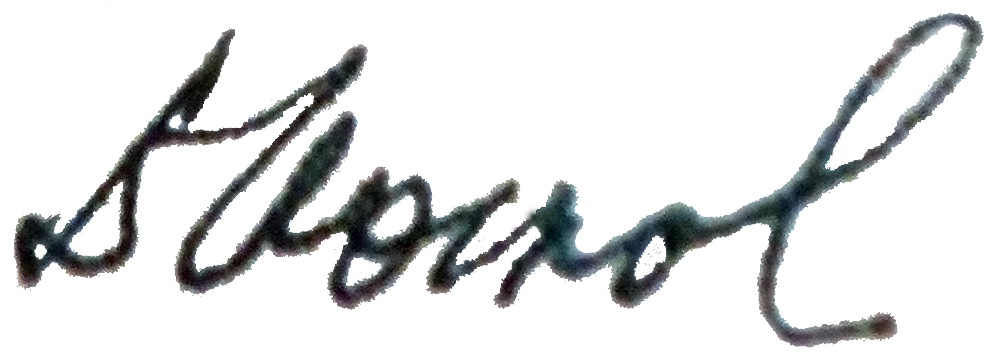

Dmitry Ilyich Kozlov (Russian: Дмитрий Ильич Козлов; 1 October 1919, Tikhoretsk – 7 March 2009, Samara) was a Russian aerospace engineer who founded the Progress Rocket Space Center, the developer and manufacturer of the Soyuz family of rockets.

Kozlov fought the Nazis in the Second World War, losing his left arm. In the 1950s he worked under Sergey Korolyov and was in charge of designing the R-7 missile, the design of which would become the basis of the Soyuz rocket. As a leading designer of intercontinental ballistic missiles Kozlov was awarded a Lenin Prize (1957), two USSR State Prizes (1976, 1983), a Russian Federation State Prize (1994) and was named a Hero of Socialist Labour on two occasions (1961, 1979).

== Early life ==
Kozlov was born on October 1, 1919, in the village of Tikhoretskaya in the Caucasian Department of the Kuban Region (now Tikhoretsk, Krasnodar Krai, Russia). His father worked in railway transport so he moved schools frequently. He studied in Vladikavkaz, Grozny, Novorossiyk and finally graduating from high school in Pyatigorsk in 1937. He'd hoped to be a sailor, but was not accepted into naval school due to his poor eyesight.In 1937 he enrolled the Leningrad Military Mechanical Institute until his fifth year when he enrolled in the Leningrad People's Militia in 1941 on the outbreak of World War II.

== Military career ==
While in the Leningrad Peoples Militia, he was wounded in August 1941 in the battles near Luha. After recovering from his wounds, he enlisted in the Red Army's 165th Construction Battalion of the 2nd Shock Army on the Volkhov Front. He became a second lieutenant in November 1943 and by the end of 1943, he was the platoon commander of the 71st Separate Marine Rifle Brigade. During the Leningrad-Novgorod offensive operation (January–February 1944), he was seriously wounded for a second time. During the Vyborg offensive operation on July 12, 1944, he lost his left arm. In September 1944, he was finally demobilized for his disabilities, so he returned to his education.

== Further education ==
After Dmitri returned to the Leningrad Military Mechanical Institute, he graduated in December 1945. In 1946, he studied at a special course at the Moscow Higher Technical School. In June 1946, he worked as part of a technical commission to study the captured rocket technology from Germany when he met Sergey Korolyov.

== Work ==
In May 1946, he worked at Plant No. 88 of the Ministry of Armament of the USSR in Kaliningrad on the development of long-range guided ballistic missiles. Starting in June 1951, he worked at OKB-1 of the State Committee of the Council of Ministers of the USSR for Defense Equipment in Kaliningrad where he became the lead designer of the R-5 ballistic missile and the world's first intercontinental ballistic missile: the R-7. In April 1958, he became the Deputy Chief Designer of OKB-1 responsible for the mass production of the R-7 missile in Kuibyshev. In January 1961, Kozlov led the design of the first two stages of what would become the launch vehicle of the Vostok spacecraft, which enabled Yuri Gagarin to make the world's first human flight to outer space.After 1967, Dmitri led the development of a number of Soviet satellites that studied ecology, mapping and space research. From 1983, he was the Central Specialized Design Bureau head and general designer. In 1996, he was the General Designer of the Progress program.He retired in 2003.

== Awards and accolades ==
- Four Orders of Lenin (April 20, 1956, July 29, 1960, June 17, 1961, and July 26, 1979)
- Orders of the October Revolution (April 26, 1971)
- Patriotic War of the 1st Degree (March 11, 1985)
- Red Star (April 7, 1944)
- Russian Order "For Merit to the Fatherland", 2nd Degree (November 11, 1994)
- Gold Medal of the Russian Academy of Sciences (1996)
- Laureate of the Lenin Prize (1957)
- Two USSR State Prizes (1976, 1983)
- State Prize of the Russian Federation in the field of Science and Technology (1994)
- Honored Worker of Industry of the USSR (1989)
- Honored Worker of Science and Technology of the Russian Federation (1992)
- A bronze bust of Kozlov was installed in the city of Tikhoretsk
- In Samara, a memorial plaque was installed on the house that he lived.

== See also ==
- List of Russian inventors

== Literature ==
- "Rockets and people" – B. E. Chertok, M: "mechanical engineering", 1999. ISBN 5-217-02942-0 (in Russian);
- A.I. Ostashev, Sergey Pavlovich Korolyov - The Genius of the 20th Century — 2010 M. of Public Educational Institution of Higher Professional Training MGUL ISBN 978-5-8135-0510-2.
- "S. P. Korolev. Encyclopedia of life and creativity" - edited by C. A. Lopota, RSC Energia. S. P. Korolev, 2014 ISBN 978-5-906674-04-3
