= Biosatellite =

Artificial satellite designed to carry plants or animals in outer space

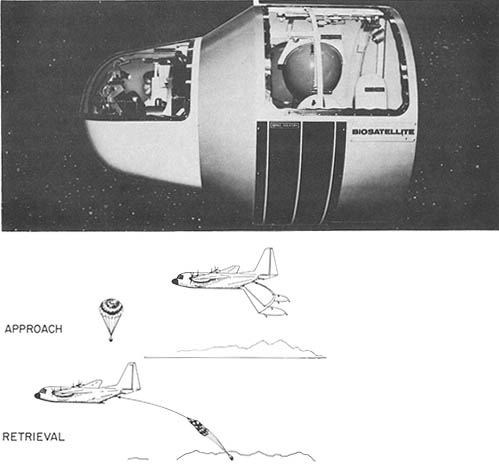
- Drawing of Biosatellite and Retrieval
- Applications: To carry plants or animals in outer space

Specifications
- Spacecraft type: Artificial satellite

Capacity

Payload to {{{to}}}

A bio satellite is an artificial satellite designed to carry plants or animals in outer space. They are used to research the effects of space (cosmic radiation, weightlessness, etc.) on biological matter while in orbit around a celestial body. The first satellite carrying an animal (a dog, "Laika") was Soviet Sputnik 2 on November 3, 1957. On August 20, 1960 Soviet Sputnik 5 launched and recovered dogs from Earth orbit.

NASA launched three such satellites between 1966 and 1969 in its Biosatellite program.

Other notable biosatellites include:

- Bion space program of the Soviet Union
- The Mars Gravity Biosatellite
- Orbiting Frog Otolith (OFO-A)

== See also ==
- Animals in space
