= Kosmos 2229 =

Soviet spacecraft aimed at biological experiments in space

Kosmos 2229 / Bion 10 Космос 2229 / Бион 10
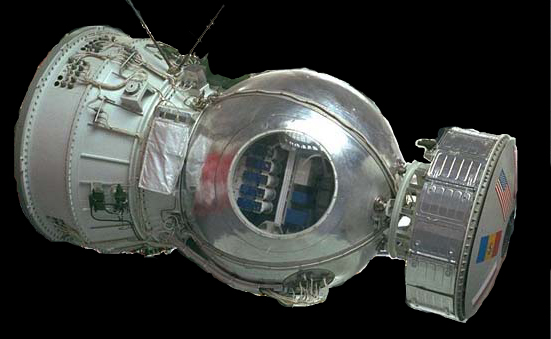
- A Bion spacecraft
- Names: Bion 10; Bion '92; Biocosmos 10; Biokosmos 10
- Mission type: Bioscience
- Operator: Institute for Medical and Biological Problems (IMBP)
- COSPAR ID: 1992-095A
- SATCAT no.: 22300
- Mission duration: 12 days

Spacecraft properties
- Spacecraft: Bion 10
- Spacecraft type: Bion
- Bus: Zenit
- Manufacturer: TsSKB
- Launch mass: 6,000 kg (13,000 lb)

Start of mission
- Launch date: 29 December 1992, 13:30:00 UTC
- Rocket: Soyuz-U 11A511U (s/n U15000-033)
- Launch site: Plesetsk, Site 43/3
- Contractor: TsSKB

End of mission
- Recovered by: Russian Space Forces
- Landing date: 10 January 1993, 04:19 UTC
- Landing site: 50°46′N 73°08′E, Karaganda Region, Kazakhstan

Orbital parameters
- Reference system: Geocentric orbit
- Regime: Low Earth orbit
- Perigee altitude: 225 km (140 mi)
- Apogee altitude: 393 km (244 mi)
- Inclination: 62.80°
- Period: 90.40 minutes

Kosmos 2229, or Bion 10 (in Russian: Бион 10, Космос 2229) was a biomedical research mission involving in ten countries plus European Space Agency (ESA). A Russian spacecraft, was launched by a Soyuz-U launch vehicle from the Plesetsk Cosmodrome. It was part of the Bion programme.

== Spacecraft ==
Several of the hardware elements on the biosatellite were improved for Kosmos 2229. The in-flight data recording system was enhanced, making high-quality brain and neuromuscular recordings possible. The monkey feeder system was improved, and a backup juice dispenser was available. The monkey restraint system was modified to allow more arm movement. The neurovestibular data acquisition system was updated through a joint American-Russian development effort, allowing more parameters to be recorded in flight.

== Mission ==
Bion 10 carried two monkeys and several insects, amphibians, plants, and cell cultures. Participating scientists were from ten countries (Canada, France, Germany, Lithuania, Netherlands, China, Russia, Ukraine, United States, and Uzbekistan), plus European Space Agency (ASE). In the planning stages this mission was named Bion '92.

The Kosmos 2229 spacecraft orbited the Earth for almost 12 days. The payload, also designated Bion 10, contained thirteen American life sciences experiments. Studies focused on bone, neuromuscular and vestibular physiology, circadian rhythms, and metabolism. Two rhesus monkeys served as experimental subjects on the mission. As on previous Kosmos biosatellite missions, the monkeys were trained to activate food and juice dispensers. In addition, they were trained to operate a foot pedal so that muscle responses could be studied in flight. For in-flight neurovestibular testing, the monkeys were trained to make hand and head movements in response to visual stimuli.

== See also ==
- 1992 in spaceflight
- Animals in space
