= Kosmos 1378 =

Soviet-era artificial satellite

Kosmos-1378
- Mission type: ELINT
- COSPAR ID: 1982-059A
- SATCAT no.: 13271
- Mission duration: 6 months (planned)

Spacecraft properties
- Spacecraft type: ELINT
- Launch mass: 2,200 kg (4,900 lb)

Start of mission
- Launch date: 10 June 1982
- Rocket: R-36 or RT-2
- Launch site: Plesetsk Cosmodrome

Orbital parameters
- Regime: Low Earth orbit
- Perigee altitude: 633 km (393 mi)
- Apogee altitude: 633 km (393 mi)
- Inclination: 82.50°
- Period: 97.6 minutes

Kosmos-1378 was one of more than 2,400 Soviet artificial satellites launched as part of the USSR space program. Kosmos-1378 was launched from the Plesetsk Cosmodrome in the USSR, on June 10, 1982. The R-36 or RT-2 (it is unclear which vehicle launched the satellite) placed the satellite in orbit around Earth. The mass of the satellite at launch was approximately 2,200 kilograms. Kosmos-1378 was a satellite designed for electronic reconnaissance, communications and navigation (ELINT).
