= Bion 11 =

Russian biological research satellite

- Mission type: Bioscience
- Operator: Institute of Biomedical Problems
- COSPAR ID: 1996-073A
- SATCAT no.: 24701
- Mission duration: 14 days (achieved)

Spacecraft properties
- Spacecraft: Bion 11
- Spacecraft type: Bion
- Bus: Zenit
- Manufacturer: TsSKB Progress
- Launch mass: 5,400 kg (11,900 lb)

Start of mission
- Launch date: 24 December 1996, 13:50:00 UTC
- Rocket: Soyuz 11A511U (s/n V15000-050)
- Launch site: Plesetsk, Site 43/4
- Contractor: TsSKB Progress

End of mission
- Recovered by: Russian Space Forces
- Landing date: 7 January 1997, 05:02 UTC
- Landing site: Kustani, Kazakhstan

Orbital parameters
- Reference system: Geocentric orbit
- Regime: Low Earth orbit
- Perigee altitude: 225.4 km (140.1 mi)
- Apogee altitude: 401.1 km (249.2 mi)
- Inclination: 62.80°
- Period: 90.50 minutes
- Revolution no.: 214

Bion 11 was a Russian biological research satellite that was part of the Bion programme. Scientists from France, Russia and United States conducted the experiments. Bion 11 was launched from the Plesetsk Cosmodrome aboard a Soyuz-U launch vehicle. It carried two monkeys named Lalik and Multik. Its 14-day mission began on 24 December 1996. The spacecraft type was based on the Zenit reconnaissance satellite and launches of Bion satellites began in 1973 with primary emphasis on the problems of radiation effects on human beings. Launches in the program included Kosmos 110, 605, 670, 782, plus Nauka modules flown on Zenit-2M reconnaissance satellites. Ninety kilograms of equipment could be contained in the external Nauka module.

== Mission ==
It carried Iberian ribbed newts, snails, Dileptus anser protozoa, Drosophila flies and other plants, insects, bacteria, and two macaque monkeys (Macaca mulatta), Lapik and Multik. Both monkeys were safe at landing, but Multik died of a heart attack during medical tests under general anaesthetic on 8 January 1997.

The Magee-8 scientific equipment was designed to study the basic features of electrostatic modular protection system. Other equipment was used to maintain the temperature and humidity within the specified range, the atmospheric regeneration, physiological parameters of the monkeys were recorded and transferred to the ground in TV picture.

== Hardware ==
The hardware supported musculoskeletal, neurovestibular, and regulatory experiments by U.S., Russian, and French investigators. Substantial ground-based hardware was developed for pre-and post-flight testing, calibration, and data collection.

It had components like Biorhythm Box (BRB), Rheoplethysmography Box (RPB), Control Interface Box (CIB) which allowed in-flight control of the Bios-Primate capsule hardware, including data recorders and video, Pre-Amplifier Box (PAB) etc.

== Bion 12 ==
A similar mission "Bion-12" was scheduled for December 1998 but did not take place due to cessation of participation of the United States.

== See also ==
- 1996 in spaceflight
- Animals in space
