= Kosmos 110 =

Soviet biological science spacecraft (Voskhod)

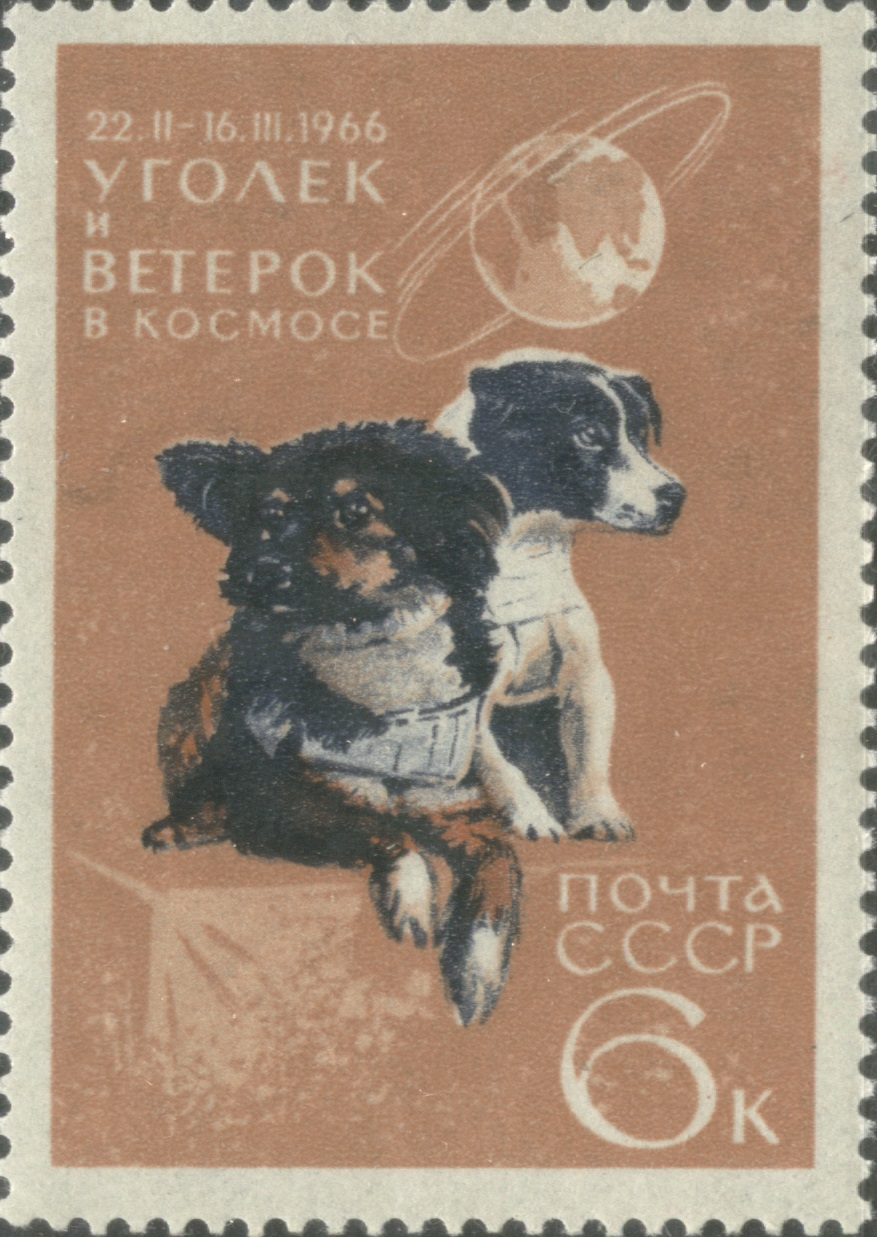
- Ugolyok and Veterok
- Mission type: Biosciences
- Operator: OKB-1
- COSPAR ID: 1966-015A
- SATCAT no.: 2070
- Mission duration: 21 days, 17 hours and 59 minutes

Spacecraft properties
- Spacecraft: Voskhod 3KV No.5
- Spacecraft type: Voskhod 3KV
- Manufacturer: OKB-1
- Launch mass: 5700 kg

Start of mission
- Launch date: 22 February 1966, 20:09:36 GMT
- Rocket: Voskhod 11A57
- Launch site: Baikonur 31/6
- Contractor: OKB-1

End of mission
- Disposal: Recovered
- Landing date: 16 March 1966, 14:09 GMT
- Landing site: Steppes of Kazakhstan, USSR

Orbital parameters
- Reference system: Geocentric orbit
- Regime: Low Earth orbit
- Perigee altitude: 190 km
- Apogee altitude: 882 km
- Inclination: 51.9°
- Period: 95.3 minutes

Kosmos 110 (Russian: Космос 110 meaning Kosmos 110) was a Soviet spacecraft launched on 22 February 1966 from the Baikonur Cosmodrome aboard a Voskhod rocket. It carried two dogs, Veterok ("Breeze") and Ugolyok ("Little piece of coal"). It was one of the more eye-catching and popular experiments of the long series of Russian Kosmos satellites.

== Mission ==
The launch of Kosmos 110 was conducted using a Voskhod 11A57 s/n R15000-06 carrier rocket, which flew from Site 31/6 at Baikonour. The launch occurred at 20:09:36 GMT on 22 February 1966. Kosmos 110 separated from its launch vehicle into a low Earth orbit with a perigee of 190 km (120 mi), an apogee of 882 km (548 mi), an inclination of 51.9°, and an orbital period of 95.3 minutes.

It incorporated a re-entry body (capsule) for landing scientific instruments and test objects. It was a biological satellite that made a sustained biomedical experiment through the Van Allen radiation belts with the dogs Veterok and Ugolyok. In addition to the two dogs, several species of plants, moisturized prior to launch, were also carried. On 16 March 1966, after 22 days in orbit around the Earth, they landed safely and were recovered by recovery forces at 14:09 GMT.The dogs had orbited the Earth 330 times.

Results from the mission showed that whilst some beans germinated poorly, lettuce grew larger all around with 50% more yield and Chinese cabbage showed greater mass. Those that germinated in space thus became the first seeds to do so. Overall the mission showed that long duration space flight had definite but variable effects on plants, with some producing better results than on Earth.

The two dogs showed severe dehydration, weight loss, loss of muscle and coordination and took several weeks to fully recover.

This spaceflight of record-breaking duration was not surpassed by humans until Skylab 2 in June 1974 and still stands as the longest space flight by dogs.

== See also ==
- 1966 in spaceflight
- Animals in space
- Soviet space dogs
