= Kosmos 782 =

Soviet biological science spacecraft (Bion 3)

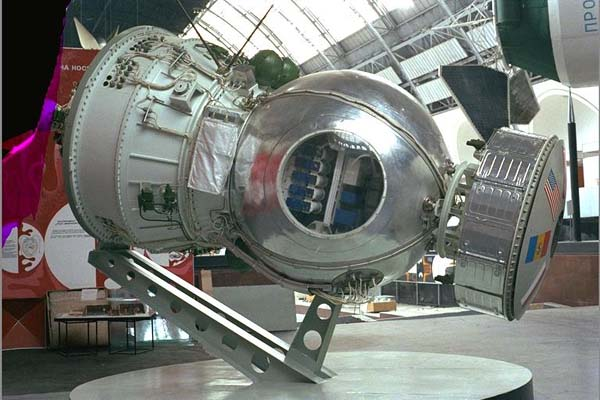
- Bion spacecraft on display at the Moscow Space Museum
- Names: Bion 3 Biocosmos 3
- Mission type: Bioscience
- Operator: Institute of Biomedical Problems
- COSPAR ID: 1975-110A
- SATCAT no.: 8450
- Mission duration: 19 days, 14 hours and 48 minutes

Spacecraft properties
- Spacecraft type: Bion
- Bus: Zenit 12KS
- Manufacturer: TsSKB
- Launch mass: 6,000 kg (13,000 lb)
- Dry mass: 3,100 kg (6,800 lb)

Start of mission
- Launch date: 25 November 1975, 14:00:00 UTC
- Rocket: Soyuz-U
- Launch site: Plesetsk 43/3
- Contractor: TsSKB

End of mission
- Disposal: Recovered
- Landing date: 15 December 1975, 04:48 UTC
- Landing site: 52°17′N 64°11′E; Near Amankaragaj, Kazakhstan, USSR

Orbital parameters
- Reference system: Geocentric
- Regime: Low Earth orbit
- Perigee altitude: 226 km (140 mi)
- Apogee altitude: 405 km (252 mi)
- Inclination: 62.8°
- Period: 90.5 minutes

Kosmos 782 or Bion 3 (Бион 3, Космос 782) was a Bion satellite. It carried 14 experiments prepared by seven countries in all, with participation from scientists in France, Czechoslovakia, Hungary, Poland, Romania, United States and the Soviet Union.

== Launch and return ==
Launched from Plesetsk Cosmodrome on 25 November 1975, at 14:00:00 UTC. The biosatellite was recovered near Amankaragaj, in Kazakhstan, Soviet Union, on 15 December 1975 after 19.5 days.

== Mission ==
It included a centrifuge with revolving and fixed sections in which identical groups of animals, plants, and cells could be compared. The subject animals included white rats and tortoises. The effects of aging on fruit fly livers and plant tissues with grafted cancerous growths were also studied. More than 20 different species were flown on the mission, including 25 unrestrained male Wistar rats, fruit flies (Drosophila melanogaster), carrot tissues, and 1,000 embryos of the fish Fundulus heteroclitus (a small shallow-water minnow). A United States radiation dosimeter experiment was also carried out without using biological materials. This experiment was the only joint U.S./U.S.S.R. study flown on the Kosmos series of biosatellites that was developed by Johnson Space Center (JSC); all others were developed and managed by Ames Research Center (ARC).

== See also ==
- 1975 in spaceflight

== Bibliography ==
- Kozlov, D. I. (1996), Mashnostroenie, ed.; Konstruirovanie avtomaticheskikh kosmicheskikh apparatov, Moscow, ISBN
- Melnik, T. G. (1997), Nauka, ed.; Voenno-Kosmicheskiy Sili, Moscow, ISBN
- "Bion' nuzhen lyudyam", Novosti Kosmonavtiki (6): 35, 1996
