= Bion (satellite) =

Soviet and Russian spacecraft aimed at biological experiments in space

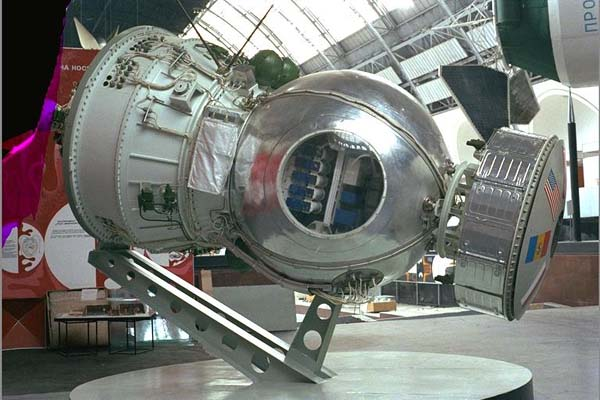
- A Bion spacecraft, on display
- Manufacturer: TsSKB Progress
- Designer: OKB-1
- Country of origin: Soviet Union; Russia
- Operator: OKB-1
- Applications: Bioscience

Specifications
- Regime: Low Earth orbit
- Design life: 5-22 days

Production
- Status: Retired (Bion-M in service)
- Launched: 11
- Maiden launch: Kosmos 605; 31 October 1973
- Last launch: Bion No.11; 24 December 1996

Related spacecraft
- Derived from: Vostok; Voskhod; Zenit
- Derivatives: Bion-M

Configuration
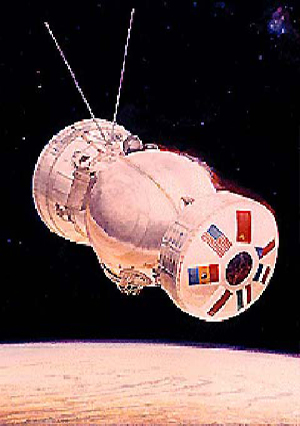
- An artist's concept of a Bion satellite in orbit

Bion (Russian: Бион), also named Biocosmos, is a series of Soviet and Russian biosatellites focused on space medicine.

== Bion space program ==
=== Bion precursor flights and Bion flights ===
The Soviet biosatellite program began in 1966 with Kosmos 110, and resumed in 1973 with Kosmos 605. Cooperation in space ventures between the Soviet Union and the United States was initiated in 1971, with the signing of the United States and Soviet Union in Science and Applications Agreement (which included an agreement on space research cooperation). The Soviet Union first offered to fly U.S. experiments on a Kosmos biosatellite in 1974, only a few years after the termination (in 1969) of the U.S. biosatellite program. The offer was realized in 1975 when the first joint U.S./Soviet research were carried out on the Kosmos 782 mission.

The Bion spacecraft were based on the Zenit spacecraft and launches began in 1973 with primary emphasis on the problems of radiation effects on human beings. Launches in the program included Kosmos 110, 605, 690, 782, plus Nauka modules flown on Zenit-2M reconnaissance satellites. 90 kg (200 lb) of equipment could be contained in the external Nauka module.

The Soviet/Russian Bion program provided U.S. investigators a platform for launching Fundamental Space Biology and biomedical experiments into space. The Bion program, which began in 1966, included a series of missions that flew biological experiments using primates, rodents, insects, cells, and plants on a biosatellite in near Earth orbit. NASA became involved in the program in 1975 and participated in 9 of the 11 Bion missions. NASA ended its participation in the program with the Bion No.11 mission launched in December 1996. The collaboration resulted in the flight of more than 100 U.S. experiments, one-half of all U.S. life sciences flight experiments accomplished with non-human subjects.

The missions ranged from five days (Bion 6) (Kosmos 1514) to around 22 days (Bion 1 and Kosmos 110).

=== Bion-M ===
In 2005, the Bion program was resumed with three new satellites of the modified Bion-M type – the first flight was launched on 19 April 2013 from Baikonur Cosmodrome, Kazakhstan. The first satellite of the new series Bion-M1 featured an aquarium by the German Aerospace Center (DLR) and carried 45 mice, 18 Mongolian gerbils, 15 geckos, snails, fish and micro-organisms into orbit for 30 days before re-entry and recovery. All the gerbils died due to a hardware failure, but condition of the rest of the experiments, including all geckos, was satisfactory. Half the mice died as was predicted.

Bion-M2 was launched on 20 August 2025 on a Soyuz 2.1b rocket to an altitude of 380 km. The orbiter carried 75 mice, 1500 fruit flies, and a variety of other small organisms to study how they were affected at the molecular level by space radiation.

== Launch history ==
Bion (satellite)
Bion program	Bion no.	Kosmos no.	Launch Date (UTC)	Rocket	Launch Site
Precursor flight	—N/a	Kosmos 110	22 February 1966, 20:09:36	Voskhod	Baikonur, Site 31/6
Bion flights	Bion 1	Kosmos 605	31 October 1973, 18:24:59	Soyuz-U	Plesetsk, Site 43/3
Bion flights	Bion 2	Kosmos 690	22 October 1974, 17:59:59	Soyuz-U	Plesetsk, Site 43/4
Bion flights	Bion 3	Kosmos 782	25 November 1975, 17:00:00	Soyuz-U	Plesetsk, Site 43/3
Bion flights	Bion 4	Kosmos 936	3 August 1977, 14:00:00	Soyuz-U	Plesetsk, Site 43/3
Bion flights	Bion 5	Kosmos 1129	25 September 1979, 15:30:00	Soyuz-U	Plesetsk, Site 41/1
Bion flights	Bion 6	Kosmos 1514	14 December 1983, 07:00:00	Soyuz-U	Plesetsk, Site 41/1
Bion flights	Bion 7	Kosmos 1667	10 July 1985, 03:15:00	Soyuz-U	Plesetsk, Site 41/1
Bion flights	Bion 8	Kosmos 1887	29 September 1987, 12:50:00	Soyuz-U	Plesetsk, Site 41/1
Bion flights	Bion 9	Kosmos 2044	15 September 1989, 06:30:00	Soyuz-U	Plesetsk, Site 41/1
Bion flights	Bion 10	Kosmos 2229	29 December 1992, 13:30:00	Soyuz-U	Plesetsk, Site 43/3
Bion flights	Bion 11	—N/a	24 December 1996, 13:50:00	Soyuz-U	Plesetsk, Site 43/4
Bion-M flights	Bion-M No.1	—N/a	19 April 2013, 10:00:00	Soyuz 2.1a	Baikonur, Site 31/6
Bion-M flights	Bion-M No.2		20 August 2025, 20:13:10	Soyuz 2.1b	Baikonur, Site 31/6
Bion-M flights	Bion-M No.3		2030		

== See also ==
- BIOPAN
- Biosatellite program
- EXPOSE
- Foton-M2
- Interkosmos
- List of Kosmos satellites
- List of microorganisms tested in outer space
- O/OREOS
- OREOcube
- Progress Rocket Space Centre
- Tanpopo
- Zond 5
