= Progress Rocket Space Centre =

Russian aerospace company

Coordinates: 53°13′14.52″N 50°18′04.32″E

Rocket and Space Centre "Progress"
- Native name: Ракетно-космический центр «Прогресс»
- Type: Joint-stock company
- Industry: Aerospace
- Predecessor: Central Specialized Design Bureau (TsSKB); State Aviation Factory No. 1 ("Progress")
- Founded: 12 April 1996 as TsSKB-Progress
- Founder: Dmitri Kozlov
- Headquarters: Samara, Russia
- Key people: Dmitry Baranov (General Director)
- Products: Soyuz-2.1a; Soyuz-2.1b; Volga
- Revenue: $593 million (2017)
- Operating income: $26.5 million (2017)
- Net income: $21.7 billion (2017)
- Total assets: $1.69 billion (2017)
- Total equity: $488 million (2017)
- Number of employees: 17,703
- Parent: Roscosmos
- Website: samspace.ru

Rocket and Space Centre "Progress" (Russian: Ракетно-Космический Центр «Прогресс», romanized: Raketno-Kosmicheskiy Tsentr "Progress"), commonly known as RKTs Progress (Russian: РКЦ Прогресс), is a Russian joint-stock company under Roscosmos. It is responsible for building and operating the Soyuz family of rockets, which serve as the primary launch vehicles for the Russian space program.

The company traces its origins to the Soviet-era State Aviation Factory No. 1, established in Samara in 1941, which came to be known as "Progress." In 1974, the Central Specialized Design Bureau (TsSKB) was established to refine the R-7 rocket’s design. In 1996, these two entities merged to form the company TsSKB-Progress.

== History ==
The company traces its origins to the Dux Factory, established in Moscow in 1894 as a small bicycle manufacturer. At the start of the 20th century, the Dux Factory transitioned from bicycles to producing cars and airships. By 1910, its focus shifted to aircraft manufacturing. During World War I, Dux supplied the Russian Army with various aircraft, including the Morane-Saulnier G, Voisin L, Voisin LAS, Nieuport 17, Nieuport 24, and several models from the Farman family (IV, VII, XVI, XXX). The factory also produced a significant number of military bicycles. By 1917, it had become one of the largest aircraft manufacturing centers in the Russian Empire.

After the October Revolution, the plant was nationalized and renamed State Aviation Factory No. 1 (GAZ No. 1). It continued producing Farman and Nieuport aircraft. In October 1941, during World War II, GAZ No. 1 was evacuated from Moscow to Kuibyshev (now Samara), near the Volga River. There, at the newly established "Progress" factory, workers produced Ilyushin Il-2 and Il-10 aircraft alongside the Mikoyan-Gurevich MiG-3. By the end of the war, the factory had produced 11,863 Il-2s, 1,225 Il-10s, and 3,122 MiG-3s—averaging about 15 aircraft per day over four years. Remarkably, one in six Soviet aircraft used in combat during the war was built at the Progress factory. After the war ended, the Progress factory began manufacturing jet aircraft, starting with the Mikoyan-Gurevich MiG-9 and MiG-15 fighters in 1946. By 1954, it was producing Tupolev Tu-16 bombers. In the post-war years, the factory also produced the MiG-17 fighter and Il-28 bomber.

Meanwhile, the R-7 Semyorka, the world's first intercontinental ballistic missile (ICBM), was under development at OKB-1 in Kaliningrad, a Soviet design bureau led by rocket pioneer Sergei Korolev. Initially designed to deliver nuclear warheads to American targets, it was first successfully tested on 21 August 1957. These early prototype R-7 missiles were built at the OKB-1 facilities, but they were not suited to large-scale serial production. On 2 January 1958, the USSR Council of Ministers approved converting the Progress factory to mass-produce the R-7 missiles. Korolev dispatched his deputy, Dmitry Kozlov, to oversee the effort. On 17 February 1959, the first R-7 missile produced at Progress was test fired.

On 23 July 1959, OKB-1 established a branch office in Samara to focus on refining R-7 designs. Under Dmitry Kozlov’s leadership, this office evolved into the independent Central Specialized Design Bureau (TsSKB, Russian: Центральное Специализированное Конструкторское Бюро [ЦСКБ], romanized: Tsentral'noye Spetsializirovannoye Konstruktorskoye Byuro) in 1974. TsSKB and Progress collaborated on the design, development, and production of Soyuz rockets. In 1996, TsSKB and Progress merged to form TsSKB-Progress, later renamed Rocket and Space Centre "Progress" (RKTs Progress).

The Progress factory has significantly contributed to the Soviet and Russian space programs. The rocket that launched Yuri Gagarin, the first human in space, was built at the factory. Since 1961, all launches of Soviet and Russian crewed spacecraft have relied on Progress-built rockets.

The Soyuz launch vehicle, derived from the R-7 design, became the enterprise’s most renowned product. With ongoing upgrades, Soyuz rockets remain a reliable launch vehicle for crewed and uncrewed missions. TsSKB and Progress have built and developed several versions, including the Soyuz-U, Soyuz-U2, Molniya-M, Soyuz-FG, Soyuz-ST and Soyuz-2.1v. As of 2025, two versions remain in use: the medium-lift Soyuz-2.1a and Soyuz-2.1b. The company has also developed the retired Ikar and currently available Volga upper stages. Since the 1960s, the company has also developed various spacecraft, including the Zenit, Bion, Foton, and Resurs-P series. In March 2024, the 1,000th spacecraft developed by RKTs Progress was launched into orbit.

On 15 August 2026, Ukrainian FP-5 Flamingo missiles struck the Progress Rocket Space Centre in Samara. The Progress factory builds the Soyuz-2.1b rockets used to launch Rassvet satellites. Rassvet is the Russian analogue of Starlink.

== Rockets produced ==
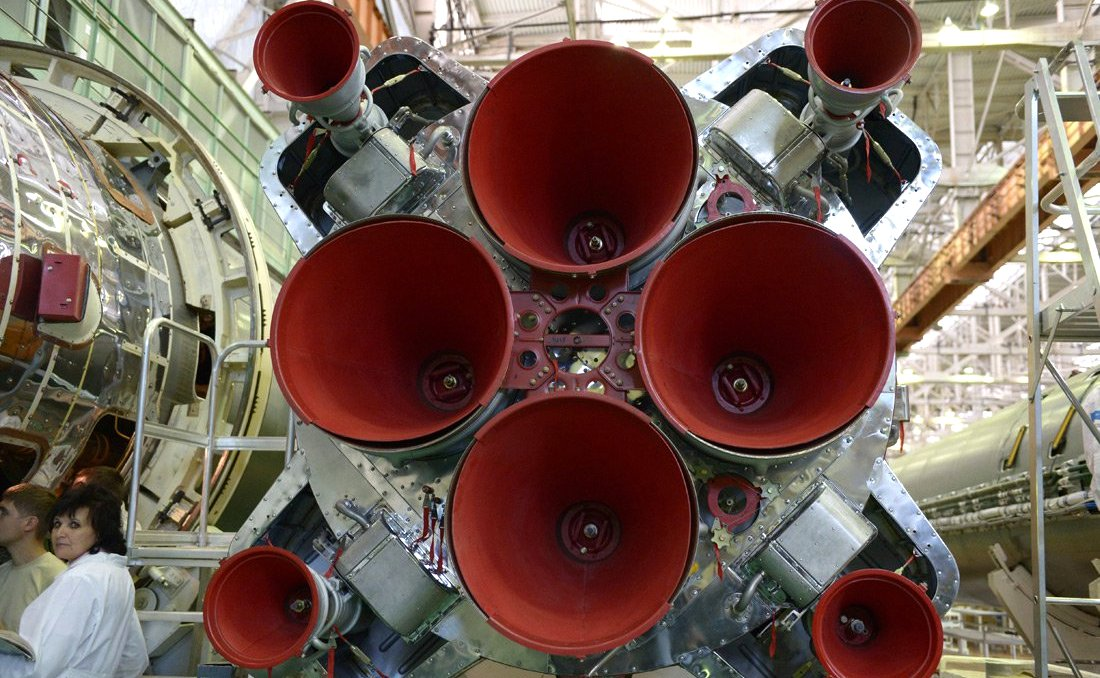
Soyuz-FG rocket under construction at the Progress factory, May 2014

Current

- Soyuz-2.1a/2.1b — medium-lift launch vehicles
- Volga — upper stage

Former

- Molniya-M
- Soyuz-U
- Soyuz-U2
- Soyuz-FG
- Soyuz-ST
- Soyuz-2.1v — small-lift launch vehicle
- Ikar

== Satellites produced ==
- Bion
- Foton
- Orlets
- Persona
- Resurs
- Yantar
- Zenit
