= Animals in space =

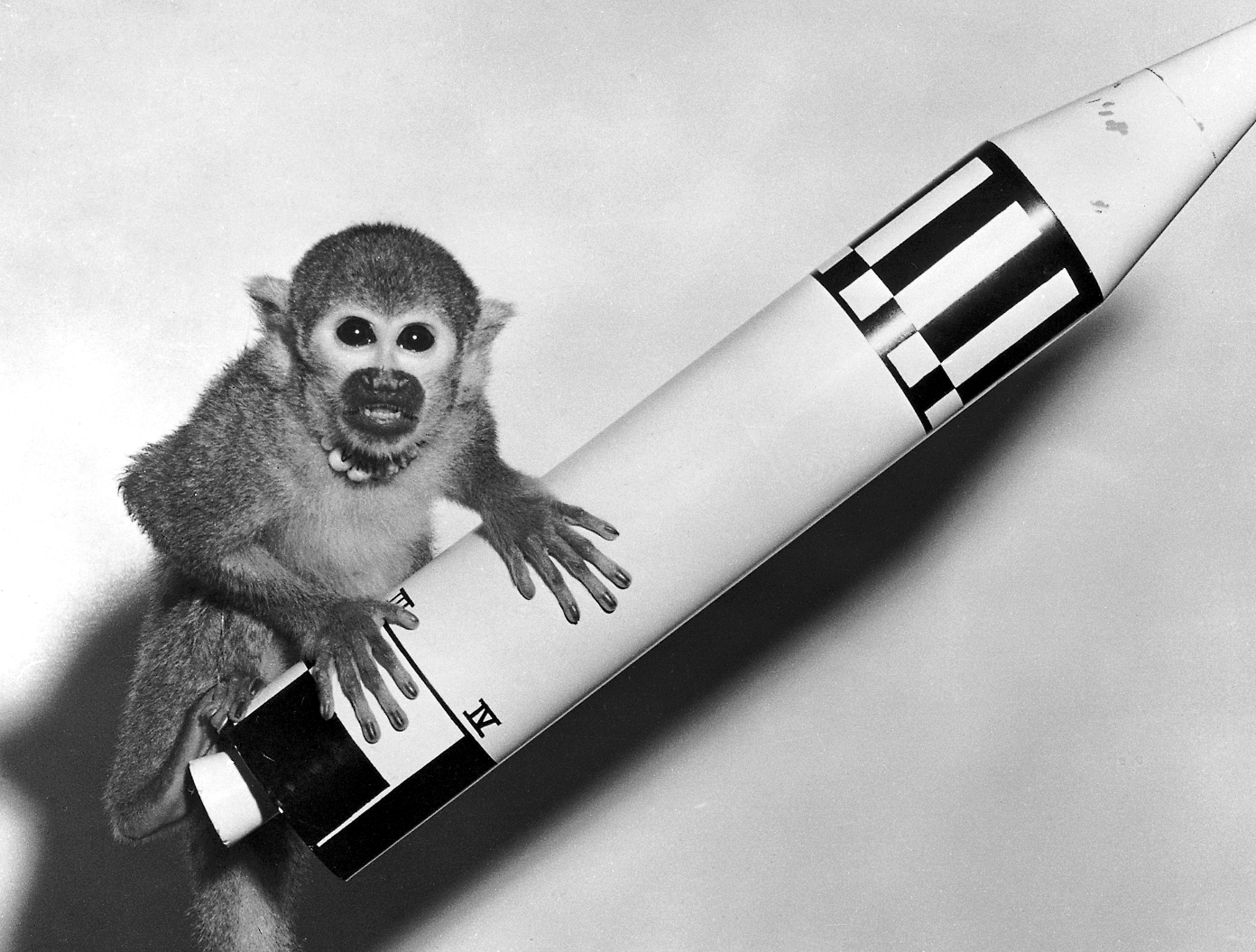
Miss Baker, a squirrel monkey, rode a Jupiter IRBM (scale model of rocket shown) into space in 1959.

Animals in space originally served to test the survivability of spaceflight, before human spaceflights were attempted. Later, many species were flown to investigate various biological processes and the effects microgravity and space flight might have on them. Bioastronautics is an area of bioengineering research that spans the study and support of life in space. To date, seven national space programs have flown non-human animals into space: the United States, Soviet Union, France, Argentina, China, Japan and Iran.

A wide variety of non-human animals have been launched into space, including monkeys and apes, dogs, cats, tortoises, mice, rats, rabbits, fish, frogs, spiders, insects, and quail eggs (which hatched on Mir in 1990). The US launched the first living beings into space, with fruit flies surviving a 1947 flight, followed by primates in 1949. The Soviet space program launched multiple dogs into space, with the first sub-orbital flights in 1951, and first orbital flights in 1957.

Two tortoises and several varieties of plants were the first living beings to circle the Moon in September 1968 on the Zond 5 mission. In 1972, five mice nicknamed Fee, Fi, Fo, Fum, and Phooey orbited the Moon a record 75 times aboard command module America as part of the Apollo 17 mission.

== Background ==
In the 16th century, German rocketry works suggested using cats and birds as animal-borne bombs.

Animals had been used in aeronautic exploration since 1783 when the Montgolfier brothers sent a sheep, a duck, and a rooster aloft in a hot air balloon to see if ground-dwelling animals could survive (the duck serving as the experimental control). In the early 19th century Claude Ruggieri launched animals with rockets.

The limited supply of captured German V-2 rockets led to the U.S. use of high-altitude balloon launches carrying fruit flies, mice, hamsters, guinea pigs, cats, dogs, frogs, goldfish and monkeys to heights of up to 44,000 m (144,000 ft; 27 mi). These high-altitude balloon flights from 1947 to 1960 tested radiation exposure, physiological response, life support and recovery systems. The U.S. high-altitude manned balloon flights occurred in the same time frame, one of which also carried fruit flies.

== Timeline ==
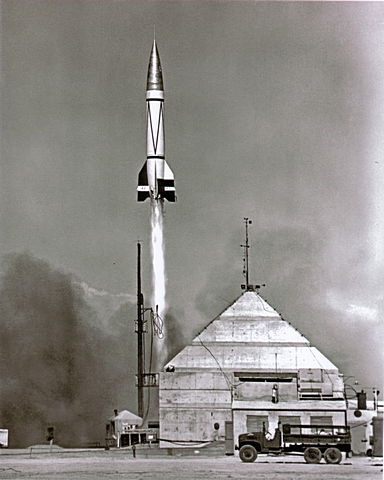
V2 launch No. 47 carried the first mammal, a rhesus monkey named Albert II, into space on June 14, 1949.

=== 1940s ===
The first animals sent into space were fruit flies aboard a U.S.-launched V-2 rocket on 9 July 1946 from White Sands Missile Range, New Mexico. A later batch launched on 20 February 1947 became the first to be returned to Earth alive. The purpose of the experiment was to explore the effects of radiation exposure at high altitudes. The rocket reached 109 km (68 mi) in 3 minutes 10 seconds, past both the U.S. Air Force 80 km (50 mi) and the international 100 km definitions of the boundary of space. The Blossom capsule was ejected and successfully deployed its parachute. The fruit flies were recovered alive. Other V-2 missions also carried biological samples, including moss.

Albert II, a rhesus monkey, became the first monkey, first primate, and first mammal in space on 14 June 1949, in a U.S.-launched V-2, after the failure of the original Albert's mission on ascent. Albert I reached only 48–63 km (30–39 mi) altitude; Albert II reached about 134 km (83 mi), but died on impact after a parachute failure.

Numerous monkeys of several species were flown by the U.S. in the 1950s and 1960s. Monkeys were implanted with sensors to measure vital signs, and many were under anesthesia during launch. The death rate among these monkeys was very high: about two-thirds of all monkeys launched in the 1940s and 1950s died on missions or soon after landing.

=== 1950s ===
Animals In Rocket Flight, a 1953 US Air Force film featuring two mice and two monkeys in a 37-mile high subspace flight

On 31 August 1950, the U.S. launched a mouse into space (137 km) aboard a V-2 (the Albert V flight, which, unlike the Albert I-IV flights, did not have a monkey), however, the animal died following descent because the parachute system failed. The U.S. launched several other mice in the 1950s.

On 22 July 1951, the Soviet Union launched the R-1 IIIA-1 flight, carrying the dogs Tsygan (Russian: Цыган, "Gypsy" or "Țigan/Țagaur" in romani language) and Dezik (Russian: Дезик) into space, but not into orbit. These two dogs were the first living higher organisms successfully recovered from a spaceflight. Both space dogs survived the flight, although Dezik would die on a subsequent flight. The U.S. launched mice aboard spacecraft later that year; however, they failed to reach the altitude for true spaceflight.

On 3 November 1957, the second-ever orbiting spacecraft carried the first animal into orbit, the dog Laika, launched aboard the Soviet Sputnik 2 spacecraft (nicknamed 'Muttnik' in the West). Laika died during the flight, as was expected because the technology to return spacecraft from orbit had not yet been developed. At least 10 other dogs were launched into orbit and numerous others on sub-orbital flights before the historic date of 12 April 1961, when Yuri Gagarin became the first human in space.

On 13 December 1958, a Jupiter IRBM, AM-13, was launched from Cape Canaveral, Florida, with a United States Navy-trained South American squirrel monkey named Gordo on board. The nose cone recovery parachute failed to operate and Gordo was lost. Telemetry data sent back during the flight showed that the monkey survived the 10 g of launch, 8 minutes of weightlessness and 40 g of reentry at 16,000 km/h (4,400 m/s; 9,900 mph). The nose cone sank 1,302 nautical miles (2,411 km) downrange from Cape Canaveral and was not recovered.

Monkeys Miss Able and Miss Baker became the first monkeys to survive spaceflight after their 1959 flight. On 28 May 1959, aboard Jupiter IRBM AM-18, were a 3 kg (7 lb) American-born rhesus monkey, Able, from Independence, Kansas, and a 310 g (11 oz) squirrel monkey from Peru, Baker. The monkeys rode in the nose cone of the missile to an altitude of 579 km (360 mi) and a distance of 2,735 km (1,699 mi) down the Atlantic Missile Range from Cape Canaveral, Florida. They withstood forces 38 times the normal pull of gravity and were weightless for about 9 minutes. A top speed of 16,000 km/h (4,400 m/s; 9,900 mph) was reached during their 16-minute flight. The monkeys survived the flight in good condition. Able died four days after the flight from a reaction to anesthesia, while undergoing surgery to remove an infected medical electrode. Baker was the center of media attention for the next several months as she was watched closely for any ill-effects from her space flight. She was even mated in an attempt to test her reproductive system. Baker lived until 29 November 1984, at the U.S. Space and Rocket Center in Huntsville, Alabama.

On 2 July 1959, a launch of a Soviet R2 rocket, which reached 212 kilometres (132 mi), carried two space dogs and Marfusha, the first rabbit to go into space.

A 19 September 1959 launch, a Jupiter AM-23, carried two frogs and 12 mice but was destroyed during launch.

On 4 December 1959, a rhesus macaque Sam flew on the Little Joe 2 mission of Project Mercury to an altitude of 85 km (53 mi).

=== 1960s ===
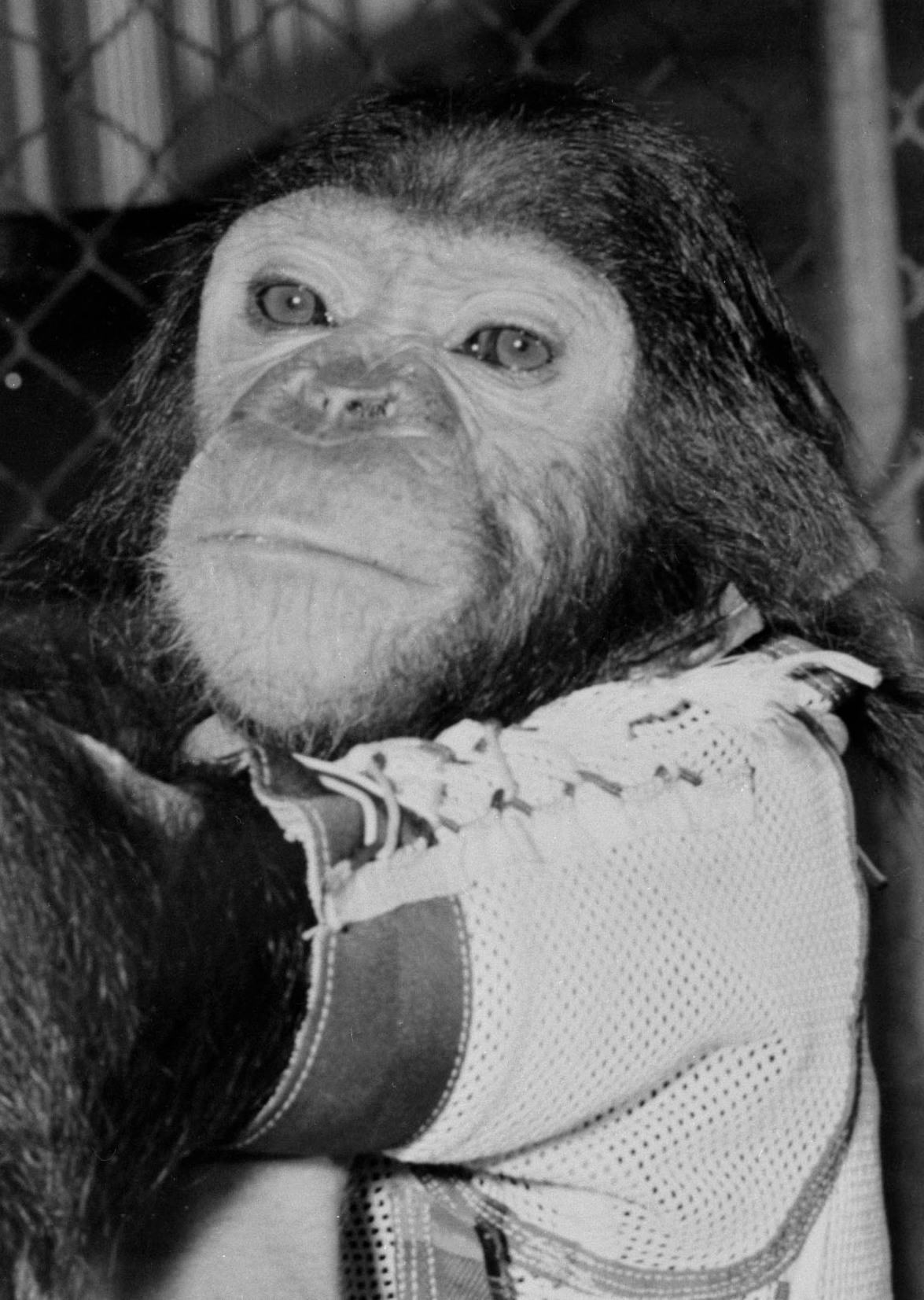
During the 29 November 1961, NASA Mercury-Atlas 5 flight, Enos became the only chimpanzee, and third primate, to orbit the Earth.

Ham, the first great ape in space, being given a physical examination in 1961

On 19 August 1960 the Soviet Union launched Sputnik 5 (also known as Korabl-Sputnik 2) which carried the dogs Belka and Strelka, along with a gray rabbit, 40 mice, 2 rats, and 15 flasks of fruit flies and plants. It was the first spacecraft to carry animals into orbit and return them alive. One of Strelka's pups, Pushinka, bred and born after her mission, was given as a present to Caroline Kennedy by Nikita Khrushchev in 1961, and many descendants are known to exist.

The US sent three black mice: Sally, Amy, and Moe 1,000 km up and 8,000 km distance from Cape Canaveral on 13 October 1960 using an Atlas D 71D launch vehicle. The mice were retrieved from the nosecone near Ascension Island and were said to be in good condition.

On 31 January 1961, Ham, a chimpanzee, was launched into sub-orbital space in a Mercury capsule aboard a Redstone rocket to become the first great ape in space. Ham's mission was Mercury-Redstone 2. The chimpanzee had been trained to pull levers to receive rewards of banana pellets and avoid electric shocks. His flight demonstrated the ability to perform tasks during spaceflight. A little over three months later the United States sent Alan Shepard into space on a suborbital flight.

Enos became the first and only chimpanzee to reach Earth orbit when, on 29 November 1961, he flew two orbits in a Mercury capsule on the Mercury-Atlas 5 mission. Two months later Project Mercury pilot John Glenn orbited the Earth.

On 9 March 1961 the Soviet Union launched the Korabl-Sputnik 4 that carried a dog named Chernushka, some mice, and, for the first time into space, a guinea pig. All were successfully recovered.

France flew their first rat (Hector) into space on 22 February 1961, successfully recovering him on his return. Two more rats were flown in October 1962.

On 18 October 1963, France launched Félicette the cat aboard Veronique AGI sounding rocket No. 47. The launch was directed by the French Centre d'Enseignement et de Recherches de Médecine Aéronautique (CERMA). Félicette was recovered alive after a 15-minute flight and a descent by parachute. Félicette had electrodes implanted into her brain, and the recorded neural impulses were transmitted back to Earth. After two months of analysis, she was euthanized so an autopsy could be performed. On 18 December 2019 a bronze statue with the effigy of Félicette was inaugurated at the "Université internationale de l'espace" in Strasbourg, France. A second cat was sent to space by CERMA on 24 October 1963, but the flight ran into difficulties that prevented recovery. In 1967, France launched two pig-tailed macaque monkeys into suborbital space.

China launched mice and rats in 1964 and 1965, and two dogs in 1966.

During the Voskhod program, two Soviet space dogs, Veterok (Ветерок, Little Wind) and Ugolyok (Уголёк, Blackie), were launched on 22 February 1966, on board Cosmos 110 and spent 22 days in orbit before landing on 16 March. This spaceflight of record-breaking duration was not surpassed by humans until Soyuz 11 in 1971 and still stands as the longest space flight by dogs.

The US launched Biosatellite I in 1966 and Biosatellite I/II in 1967 with fruit flies, parasitic wasps, flour beetles and frog eggs, along with bacteria, amoebae, plants and fungi.

On 11 April 1967, Argentina also launched the rat Belisario, atop a Yarará rocket, from Cordoba military range, which was recovered successfully. This flight was followed by a series of subsequent flights using rats. It is unclear if any Argentinean biological flights passed the 100 km limit of space.

The first animals in deep space, the first to circle the Moon, and the first two tortoises in space were launched on Zond 5 on 14 September 1968 by the Soviet Union. The Horsfield's tortoises were sent on a circumlunar voyage to the Moon along with wine flies, meal worms, and other biological specimens. These were the first inhabitants of Earth to travel around the Moon. The capsule overshot its terrestrial landing site but was successfully recovered at sea on 21 September. The animals survived but underwent weight loss. More turtles followed on the circumlunar Zond 6 mission of November 1968 (ahead of the December U.S. crewed Apollo 8 mission) and four turtles flew on the circumlunar Zond 7 mission which flew around the Moon on August 11, 1969, three weeks after Apollo 11's Moon walk.

On 28 June 1969, the US launched the monkey Bonny, a macaque, on Biosatellite 3 in what was intended to have been a 30-day orbit around the Earth, with the monkey being fed by food pellets from a dispenser that he had been trained to operate. Bonny's health deteriorated rapidly and he was returned to Earth on 7 July, but died the next day after the Biosatellite capsule was recovered in the Pacific Ocean.

In total in the 1950s and 1960s, the Soviet Union launched missions with at least 57 passenger slots for dogs. The actual number of dogs in space is smaller, because some dogs flew more than once.

On 23 December 1969, as part of the 'Operación Navidad' (Operation Christmas), Argentina launched Juan (a cai monkey, native of Argentina's Misiones Province) using a Canopus II rocket. It ascended 82 kilometers and then was recovered successfully. Later, on 1 February 1970 the experience was repeated with a female monkey of the same species using a X-1 Panther rocket. It reached a higher altitude than its predecessor, but it was lost after the capsule's parachute failed.

=== 1970s ===
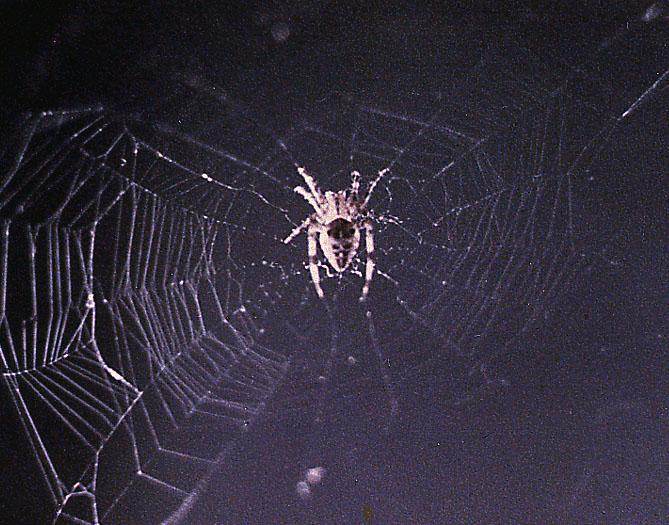
First spider web built in space (during Skylab 3, 1973)

Two bullfrogs were launched on a one-way mission on the Orbiting Frog Otolith satellite on 9 November 1970, to understand more about space motion sickness.

Apollo 16, launched on 16 April 1972, carried nematodes. Apollo 17, launched on 7 December 1972, carried five pocket mice, Fee, Fi, Fo, Fum, and Phooey, who stayed in the command module with astronaut Ronald Evans as it circled the Moon for six days. One of the mice died on the trip.

Skylab 3 (1973) carried pocket mice and the first fish in space (a mummichog), and the first spiders in space (garden spiders named Arabella and Anita). Mummichog were also flown by the U.S. on the Apollo–Soyuz joint mission, launched 15 July 1975.

The Soviets flew several Bion program missions which consisted of satellites with biological cargoes. On these launches they flew tortoises, rats, and mummichog. On Soyuz 20, launched 17 November 1975, tortoises set the duration record for an animal in space when they spent 90.5 days in space. Salyut 5 on 22 June 1976, carried tortoises and a fish (a zebra danio).

=== 1980s ===
The Soviet Union sent eight monkeys into space in the 1980s on Bion flights. Bion flights also flew zebra danio, fruit flies, rats, stick insect eggs and the first newts in space.

In 1985, the U.S. sent two squirrel monkeys aboard Spacelab 3 on the Space Shuttle with 24 male albino rats.

Bion 7 (1985) had 10 newts (Pleurodeles waltl) on board. The newts had part of their front limbs amputated, to study the rate of regeneration in space, knowledge to understand human recovery from space injuries.

After an experiment was lost in the Space Shuttle Challenger disaster, chicken embryos (fertilized eggs) were sent into space in an experiment on STS-29 in 1989. The experiment was designed for a student contest.

=== 1990s ===
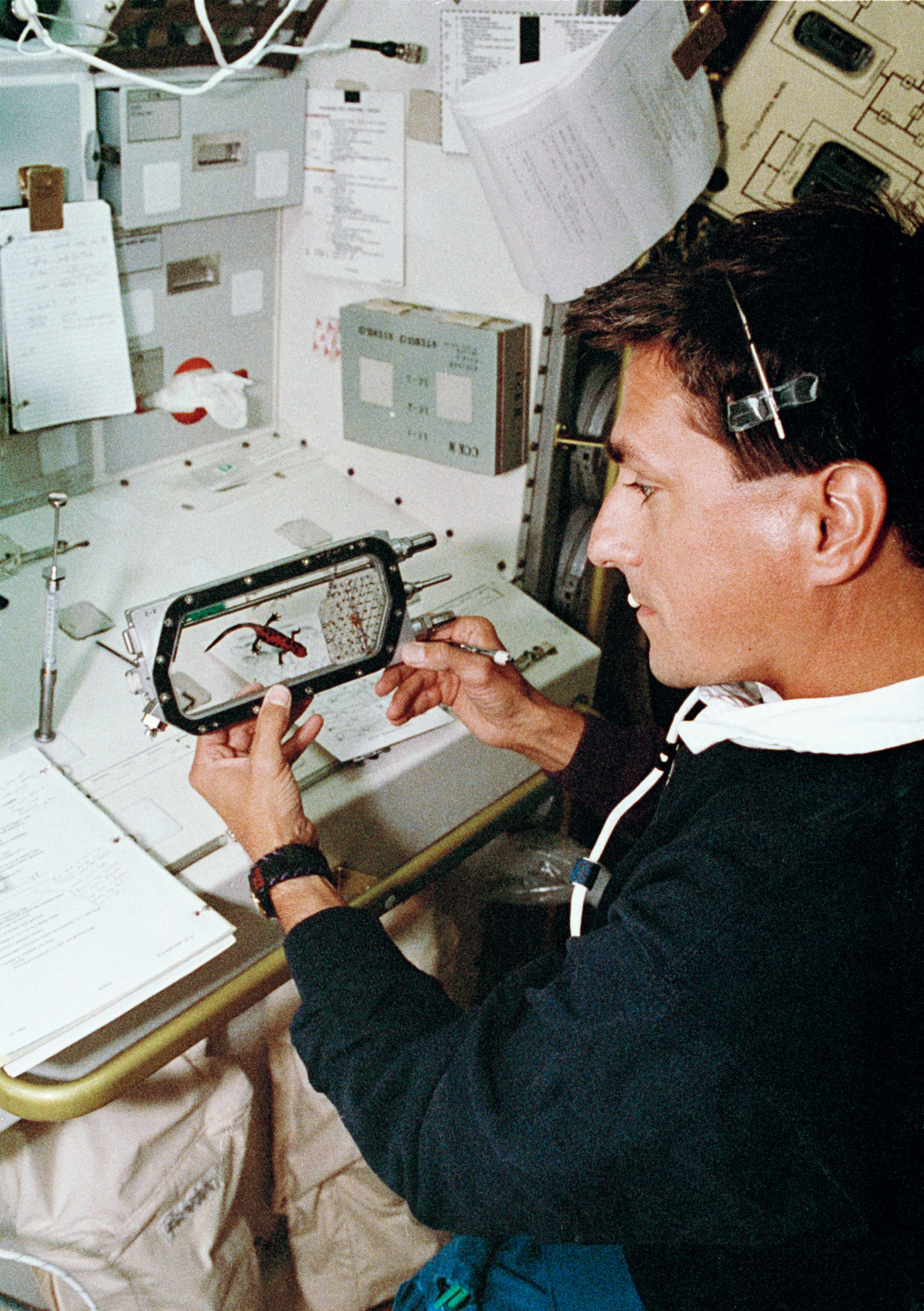
Astronaut Donald Thomas examines a newt on the Space Shuttle Columbia during a 1994 mission

First animal born in space was quail born on Mir (22 March of 1990).

Four monkeys flew aboard the last Bion flights of the Soviet Union as well as frogs and fruit flies. The Foton program flights carried dormant brine shrimp (Artemia franciscana), newts, fruit flies, and sand desert beetles (Trigonoscelis gigas).

China launched guinea pigs in 1990.

Toyohiro Akiyama, a Japanese journalist, carried Japanese tree frogs with him during his trip to the Mir space station in December 1990. Other biological experiments aboard Mir involved quail eggs.

In 1994, four Japanese rice fish successfully mated and laid eggs that hatched to produce healthy fry aboard STS-65, making them the first animals to conceive and bear offspring in space.

Japan launched its first animals, a species of newt, into space on 18 March 1995 aboard the Space Flyer Unit.

During the 1990s the U.S. carried crickets, mice, rats, frogs, newts, fruit flies, snails, carp, medaka (rice fish), oyster toadfish, sea urchins, swordtail fish, spongy moth eggs, stick insect eggs, brine shrimp (Artemia salina), quail eggs, and jellyfish aboard Space Shuttles.

=== 2000s ===
The last flight of Columbia in 2003 carried silkworms, garden orb spiders, carpenter bees, harvester ants, and Japanese killifish (medaka). Nematodes (C. elegans) from one experiment were found still alive in the debris after the Space Shuttle Columbia disaster.

C. elegans are also part of experiments aboard the International Space Station as well as research using quail eggs.

Earlier Space Shuttle missions included grade school, junior high and high school projects; some of these included ants, stick insect eggs and brine shrimp cysts. Other science missions included spongy moth eggs.

On 12 July 2006, Bigelow Aerospace launched their Genesis I inflatable space module, containing many small items such as toys and simple experiments chosen by company employees that would be observed via camera. These items included insects, perhaps making it the first private flight to launch animals into space. Included were Madagascar hissing cockroaches and Mexican jumping beans — seeds containing live larvae of the moth Cydia saltitans. On 28 June 2007, Bigelow launched Genesis II, a near-twin to Genesis I. This spacecraft also carried Madagascar hissing cockroaches and added South African flat rock scorpions (Hadogenes troglodytes) and seed-harvester ants (Pogonomyrmex californicus).

In September 2007, during the European Space Agency's FOTON-M3 mission, tardigrades, also known as water-bears, were able to survive 10 days of exposure to open-space with only their natural protection.

On the same mission, a number of cockroaches were carried inside a sealed container and at least one of the females, named Nadezhda, conceived during the mission and produced 33 offspring after returning to Earth.

On 15 March 2009, during the countdown of the STS-119, a free-tailed bat was seen clinging to the fuel tank. NASA observers believed the bat would fly off once the Shuttle started to launch, but it did not. Upon analyzing the images, a wildlife expert who provided support to the center said it likely had a broken left wing and some problem with its right shoulder or wrist. The animal most likely perished quickly during Discovery's climb into orbit.

In November 2009, STS-129 took painted lady and monarch butterfly larvae into space for a school experiment as well as thousands of C. elegans roundworms for long-term weight loss studies.

=== 2010s ===
In May 2011, the last flight of Space Shuttle Endeavour (STS-134) carried two golden orb spiders, named Gladys and Esmeralda, as well as a fruit fly colony as their food source in order to study the effects of microgravity on spiders' behavior. Tardigrades and extremophiles were also sent into orbit.

In November 2011, the Living Interplanetary Flight Experiment on the Fobos-Grunt mission planned to carry tardigrades to Mars and back; however, the mission failed to leave Earth orbit.

In October 2012, 32 medaka fish were delivered to the International Space Station by Soyuz TMA-06M for the new Aquatic Habitat in the Kibo module.

On 28 January 2013, Iranian news agencies reported that Iran sent a monkey in a "Pishgam" rocket to a height of 116 km (72 mi) and retrieved a "shipment". Later Iran's space research website uploaded an 18-minute video. The video was uploaded later on YouTube.

On 3 February 2013, on the 31st anniversary of its revolution, Iran became the latest country to launch animals into space. The animals (a mouse, two turtles and some worms) were launched on top of the Kavoshgar 3 rocket and returned alive to Earth.

In January 2014, the search strategies of pavement ants were studied on the ISS.

On 19 July 2014, Russia announced that they launched their Foton-M4 satellite into low Earth orbit (575 kilometers) with one male and four female geckos (possibly gold dust day geckos) as the payload. This was an effort to study the effects of microgravity on reproductive habits of reptiles. On 24 July 2014, it was announced that Russia had lost control of the Foton-M4 satellite, leaving only two months to restore contact before the geckos' food supply was exhausted. Control of the satellite was subsequently restored on 28 July 2014. On 1 September 2014 Russia confirmed the death of all five geckos, stating that their mummified bodies seem to indicate they froze to death. Russia is said to have appointed an emergency commission to investigate the animals' deaths.

On 23 September 2014, SpaceX CRS-4 mission delivered 20 mice to live on the ISS for study of the long-term effects of microgravity on the rodents. This was the first use of the Rodent Research Hardware System.

On 14 April 2015, the SpaceX CRS-6 delivered 20 C57BL/6NTAC mice to live on the ISS for evaluating microgravity as the extreme opposite of a healthy active lifestyle. In the absence of gravity, astronauts are subject to a decrease in muscle, bone, and tendon mass. "Although, we're not out to treat couch potatoes," states head Novartis Institute for Biomedical Research (NIBR) scientist on the project Dr. Sam Cadena, "we're hoping that these experiments will help us to better understand muscle loss in populations where physical activity in any form is not an option; e.g., in the frail elderly or those subjected to bed rest or immobilization due to surgery or chronic disease."

On 8 April 2016, Rodent Research 3 delivered 20 mice on SpaceX CRS-8. The experiment sponsored by Eli Lilly and Co. was a study of myostatin inhibition for the prevention of skeletal and muscle atrophy and weakness. Mice are known to have rapid loss of muscle and bone mass after as little as 12 days of space flight exposure. The mice were euthanized and dissected on the station and then frozen for eventual return to Earth for further study.

On 29 June 2018, a SpaceX Dragon spaceship blasted off from Florida carrying 20 mice. The rodent crew arrived at the ISS on 2 July 2018. Their record-breaking journey – this was the longest mice have been off the planet – was part of a study on how Earth-dwellers' physiology and sleep schedules responded to the stress of being in space.

The Chinese lunar lander Chang'e 4 carries a 3 kg sealed container with seeds and insect eggs to test whether plants and insects could hatch and grow together in synergy. The experiment includes six types of organisms: cottonseed, potato, rapeseed, Arabidopsis thaliana (a flowering plant), as well as yeast and fruit fly eggs. If the eggs hatch, the larvae would produce carbon dioxide, while the germinated plants would release oxygen through photosynthesis. A miniature camera is imaging the growth.

On 11 April 2019, the Israeli spacecraft Beresheet crashed into the Moon during a failed landing attempt. Its payload included a few thousand tardigrades. They could potentially survive on the lunar surface for some years, although it is unclear if they survived the impact.

=== 2020s ===
On 3 June 2021, SpaceX CRS-22 launched tardigrades (water bears) and Hawaiian bobtail squid to the ISS. The squid were launched as hatchlings and will be studied to see if they can incorporate their symbiotic bacteria into their light organ while in space.

== See also ==
- Alice King Chatham – American designer who designed equipment for some of the first animals in space
- Bioastronautics – Academic discipline
- Félix I, a canceled Brazilian Army project to launch a cat in 1958–59.
- List of microorganisms tested in outer space
- List of species that have landed on the Moon
- Model organism – Organisms used to study biology across species
- Monkeys and apes in space – Space travel by primates
- One Small Step: The Story of the Space Chimps, 2008 documentary
- Parachuting animals
- Plants in space – Growth of plants in outer space
- Soviet space dogs – Soviet-era program that sent dogs to space
- Space Dogs, 2010 film
- Tardigrades on the Moon
