= Vladimir Yazdovsky =

Soviet space program medical scientist

Vladimir Yazdovsky (1913–1999) was a Russian physician in the former Soviet space program.

Yazdovsky was a veteran surgeon and army doctor who joined the Institute for Aviation and Medeicine in Moscow in 1948. There, in the early 1950s, Yazdovsky assisted Sergei Korolev in tests using small animals in sub-orbital spaceflight. His team of researchers helped gather strays from Moscow and helped design various safety measures such as space suits and life-support systems.

In 1957 he prepared the dog Laika, the first animal to orbit, the Earth for Sputnik 2. In 1960 Yazdovsky prepared the dogs Belka and Strelka for Korabl-Sputnik 2, the first spaceflight to launch animals into orbit and return them alive to Earth.
