= Soviet Space Dogs (book) =

2014 book by Olesya Turkina

- Author: Olesya Turkina
- Language: English
- Subject: Soviet space dogs
- Published: 2014
- Publisher: FUEL Design (London)
- Publication place: United Kingdom
- Pages: 240
- ISBN: 978-0-9568962-8-5 (hardcover)

Soviet Space Dogs is a book written by Olesya Turkina about the dogs involved in the Soviet space program, from Laika and beyond—the Soviet space dogs. Turkina describes the lives of the once-homeless dogs that were involved in the Soviet space program, and the intense secrecy surrounding the work that would end up getting them into orbit, propelling the names Belka and Strelka into stardom. She describes the dogs as "the martyrs and saints of communism", and chronicles their impact on Soviet life as purported "pioneers for humankind".

The book saw positive reception from The Guardian, Wired, the Los Angeles Review of Books, and the Canine Chronicle, with reviewers noting the work's depth of imagery and use of now-declassified information to give humanity to those involved in the program.
