= Dezik and Tsygan =

Soviet space dogs

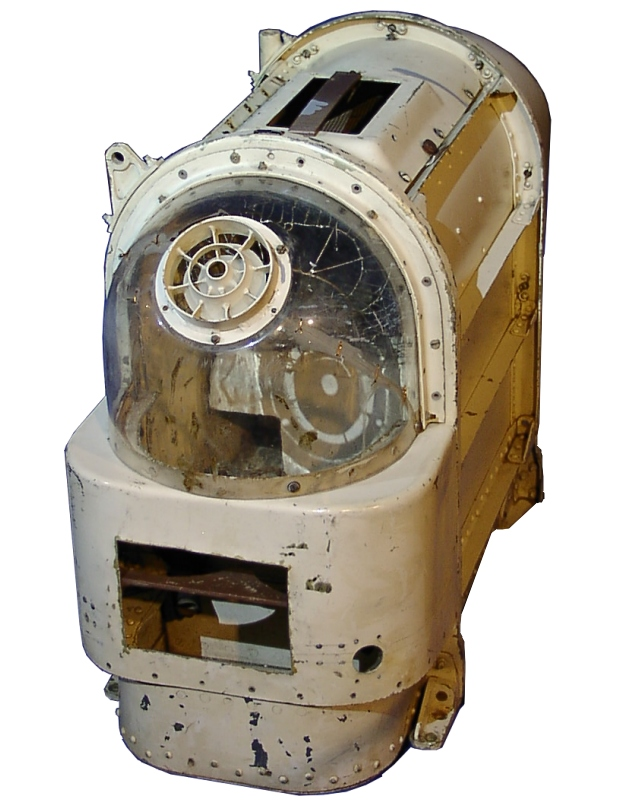
The module in which the Soviet dogs were sent into space

Dezik (Russian: Дезик) and Tsygan (Цыган, lit. 'Gypsy') were the first two Soviet space dogs and, during their suborbital flight on July 22, 1951, the first dogs to fly into space. Dezik became the first two-time space traveler during a suborbital flight later in 1951, but was killed when the parachute failed to deploy.

== Spaceflight ==
Sergei Korolev, the lead Soviet rocket engineer and spacecraft designer during the Space Race in the 1950s, chose to use dogs to send into space because he believed that the emotional attachments made by scientists with dogs would ensure their obedience, and that free-ranging dogs from the streets of Moscow were already adapted to survival. The dogs used in the spaceflight were chosen to fit specific criteria: they had to be female to allow them to urinate properly in their space suits, they had to be between 6 and 7 kilograms (13 and 15 lb) to accommodate the rocket's weight limit, and they had to have light-colored fur so that they could appear easily on the camera aboard the rocket.

Dezik and Tsygan were launched into sub-orbital spaceflight on a Soviet R-1 missile from Kapustin Yar on July 22, 1951. They reached a height of 110 kilometres (68 mi) and experienced weightlessness for four minutes before falling back to Earth with a parachute. The trip lasted for 15 minutes in total. They both survived the trip, making them the first mammals to survive spaceflight. Korolev was greatly excited by their survival, and when they landed, he grabbed them and ran around with them before giving them water, sausages, and sugar.

== Later life ==
Dezik went to space once again on 29 July 1951, this time with a dog named Lisa (Лиса, lit. 'Fox'), but both dogs were killed when their rocket's parachute failed to deploy. Korolev was emotionally devastated by their deaths.

Following the death of Dezik, Tsygan was retired and was adopted as a pet by Anatoly Blagonravov, an engineer in the Soviet space program, who said: "Let the hero come and live with me."

== See also ==
- Animals in space
- Laika – Soviet space dog, first animal to orbit Earth
- List of individual dogs
