= List of species that have landed on the Moon =

Although many species have been to space, only a few have landed on the Moon. This is a list of species that have landed on the Moon, only including landings in which the payload survived. This list currently contains 10 species. Before 2019, only humans had landed on the Moon; in January 2019, insects, plants, and fungi also landed on the Moon.

== List ==
Species	Quantity	Mission(s)	First landing date	References
Human	12	Apollo 11, Apollo 12, Apollo 14, Apollo 15, Apollo 16, Apollo 17	20 July 1969	
Silkworm	1+	Chang'e 4	3 January 2019	
Fruit fly	1+	Chang'e 4	3 January 2019	
Arabidopsis	1+	Chang'e 4	3 January 2019	
Cotton	1+	Chang'e 4	3 January 2019	
Potato	1+	Chang'e 4	3 January 2019	
Rapeseed	1+	Chang'e 4	3 January 2019	
Yeast	1+	Chang'e 4	3 January 2019	
Bacteria	1+	Chang'e 4	3 January 2019	
Tardigrade	1000+	Beresheet	11 April 2019	

== Future missions ==
These are future missions that plan to send additional organisms to the Moon.

=== Artemis IV ===
In 2028, NASA plans to send two astronauts to the Moon's surface, the first woman and the first person of color to land on the Moon. This would be the first human landing on the Moon since the 1972 Apollo 17 mission.

=== ALEPH-1 ===
After the failed landing of Beresheet in 2019, which resulted in a crash, spilling thousands of tardigades onto the Moon, Lunaria One, an Australian organization, planned to send plants such as resurrection grass with the Israeli spacecraft Beresheet 2 to the Moon in 2025 but was suspended due to lack of funding.

== Species that have orbited or circled the Moon without landing ==
Humans and other animals have orbited or circled the Moon without landing. These include tortoises on Zond 5 (September 1968), Zond 6 (November 1968), and Zond 7 (August 1969), fruit flies on Zond 5, and five mice, Fee, Fi, Fo, Fum, and Phooey, who traveled in the 1972 Apollo 17 Command Module America and, along with astronaut Ronald Evans, still hold the record for the most orbits of the Moon (75).

== See also ==
- Animals in space
- Colonization of the Moon
- List of space travelers by nationality
- List of Apollo astronauts
- Plants in space
- Tardigrades in space

== Notes ==
1. Some species are not specified due to inadequate information.
2. The number of some species is not specified due to inadequate information.
3. ALEPH-1 is the mission, Beresheet 2 is the spacecraft.
