= Laika =

Soviet dog, first animal to orbit Earth (c. 1954–1957)

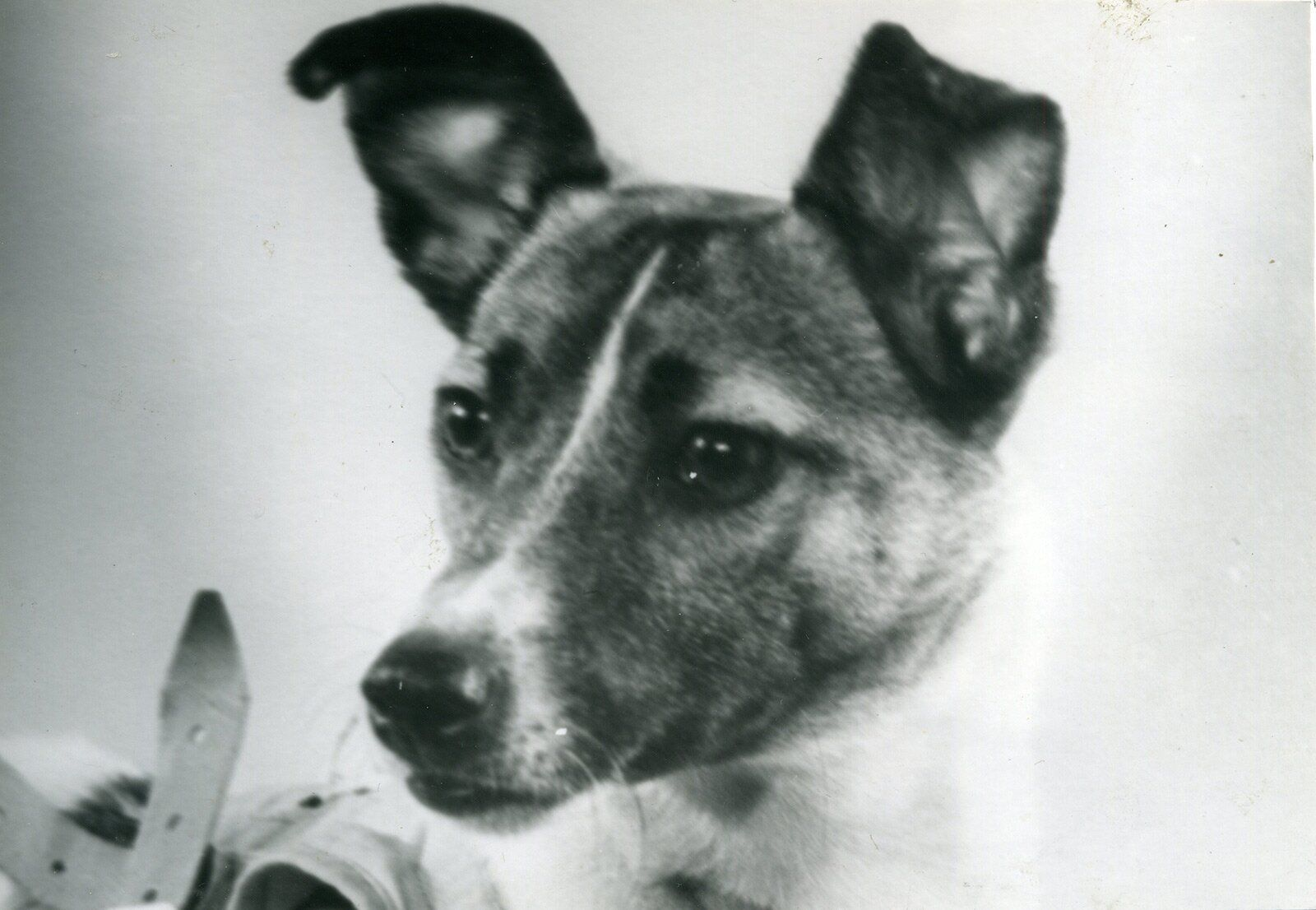
- Laika in 1957
- Other names: Kudryavka (Кудрявка, "Curly")
- Species: Canis familiaris
- Breed: Mongrel, possibly part-husky (or part-Samoyed) and part-terrier
- Sex: Female
- Born: Laika (Лайка) c. 1954; Moscow, Russian SFSR, Soviet Union
- Died: 3 November 1957 (aged 2–3); Sputnik 2, in low Earth orbit
- Cause of death: Hyperthermia (overheating)
- Known for: First animal to orbit the Earth
- Owner: Soviet space program
- Weight: 5 kg (11 lb)

Laika (/ˈlaɪkə/ LY-kə; Russian: Лайка, IPA: [ˈlajkə]; c. 1954 – 3 November 1957) was a Soviet space dog who was one of the first animals in space and the first to orbit the Earth. A stray mongrel from the streets of Moscow, she flew aboard the Sputnik 2 spacecraft, launched into low orbit on 3 November 1957. As the technology to re-enter the atmosphere had not yet been developed, Laika's survival was never expected. She died by overheating hours into the flight, on the craft's fourth orbit.

Little was known about the effects of spaceflight on living creatures at the time of Laika's mission, and animal flights were viewed by engineers as a necessary precursor to human missions. The experiment, which monitored Laika's vital signs, aimed to prove that a living organism could survive being launched into orbit and continue to function under conditions of weakened gravity and increased radiation, providing scientists with some of the first data on the biological effects of spaceflight.

Laika's death was possibly caused by a failure of the central R‑7 sustainer to separate from the payload: this affected the thermal control mechanisms, which then caused the cabin to overheat. The true cause and time of her death were not made public until 2002; instead, it was widely reported that she died when her oxygen ran out on day six or, as the Soviet government initially claimed, she was euthanised prior to oxygen depletion. In 2008, a small monument to Laika depicting her standing atop a rocket was unveiled near the military research facility in Moscow that prepared her flight. She also appears on the Monument to the Conquerors of Space in Moscow. Korabl-Sputnik 2 returned the first animals from orbit safely in 1960, dogs Belka and Strelka, testing the crewed Vostok craft.

== Sputnik 2 ==
After the success of Sputnik 1 in October 1957, Nikita Khrushchev, leader of the Soviet Union, wanted a spacecraft launched on 7 November 1957 to celebrate the 40th anniversary of the October Revolution. Khrushchev specifically wanted to deliver a "space spectacular", a mission that would repeat the triumph of Sputnik 1, stunning the world with Soviet prowess.

While construction had already started on Sputnik 3, a more sophisticated satellite, it would not be ready until December. To meet the November deadline, a new simple satellite would need to be built. Sergei Korolev proposed that a dog be placed in the satellite, an idea which was quickly adopted by planners. Soviet rocket engineers had long intended a canine orbit before attempting human spaceflight; since 1951, they had lofted 12 dogs into sub-orbital space on ballistic flights, working gradually toward an orbital mission set for some time in 1958. To satisfy Khrushchev's demands, they expedited the orbital canine flight for the November launch.

According to Russian sources, the official decision to launch Sputnik 2 was made on 10 or 12 October, leaving less than four weeks to design and build the spacecraft. Sputnik 2, therefore, was something of a rushed job, with most elements of the spacecraft being constructed from rough sketches. Aside from the primary mission of sending a living passenger into space, Sputnik 2 also contained instrumentation for measuring solar irradiance and cosmic rays.

The craft was equipped with a life-support system consisting of an oxygen generator and devices to avoid oxygen poisoning and to absorb carbon dioxide. A fan, designed to activate whenever the cabin temperature exceeded 15 °C (59 °F), was added to keep the dog cool. Enough food (in a gelatinous form) was provided for a seven-day flight, and the dog was fitted with a bag to collect waste. A harness was designed to be fitted to the dog, and there were chains to restrict her movements to standing, sitting, or lying down; there was no room to turn around in the cabin. An electrocardiogram monitored heart rate and further instrumentation tracked respiration rate, maximum arterial pressure, and the dog's movements.

== Training ==
Laika was found as a stray dog wandering the streets of Moscow. Soviet scientists chose to use Moscow strays since they assumed that such animals had already learned to endure conditions of extreme cold and hunger. She was a 5 kg (11 lb) mongrel female, approximately three years old. Another account reported that she weighed about 6 kg (13 lb). Soviet personnel gave her several names and nicknames, among them Kudryavka (Russian for Little Curly), Zhuchka (Little Bug), and Limonchik (Little Lemon). Laika, the Russian name for several breeds of dogs similar to the husky, was the name popularised around the world. Its literal translation would be "Barker", from the Russian verb "layat" (лаять), "to bark". According to some accounts, the technicians actually renamed her from Kudryavka to Laika owing to her loud barking. The American press dubbed her Muttnik (mutt + suffix -nik) as a pun on Sputnik, or referred to her as Curly. Her true pedigree is unknown, although it is generally accepted that she was part husky or other Nordic breed, and possibly part terrier. NASA refers to Laika as a "part-Samoyed terrier". A Russian magazine described her temperament as phlegmatic, saying that she did not quarrel with other dogs.

The Soviet Union and United States had previously sent animals only on sub-orbital flights. Three dogs were trained for the Sputnik 2 flight: Albina, Mushka, and Laika. Soviet space-life scientists Vladimir Yazdovsky and Oleg Gazenko trained the dogs.

To adapt the dogs to the confines of the tiny cabin of Sputnik 2, they were kept in progressively smaller cages for periods of up to twenty days. The extensive close confinement caused them to stop urinating or defecating, made them restless, and caused their general condition to deteriorate. Laxatives did not improve their condition, and the researchers found that only long periods of training proved effective. The dogs were placed in centrifuges that simulated the acceleration of a rocket launch and were placed in machines that simulated the noises of the spacecraft. This caused their pulses to double and their blood pressure to increase by 30–65 torrs (4.0–8.7 kPa). The dogs were trained to eat a special high-nutrition gel that would be their food in space. It was made up of 40% bread crumbs, 40% powdered meat and 20% beef fat mixed with agar and water. Presumably the formula was 200 mL (7.0 imp fl oz) of water, agar, and 100 g (3.5 oz) of food.

Ten days before the launch, Vladimir Yazdovsky chose Laika to be the primary flight dog. Before the launch, Yazdovsky took Laika home to play with his children. In a book chronicling the story of Soviet space medicine, he wrote, "Laika was quiet and charming ... I wanted to do something nice for her: She had so little time left to live."

== Preflight preparations ==
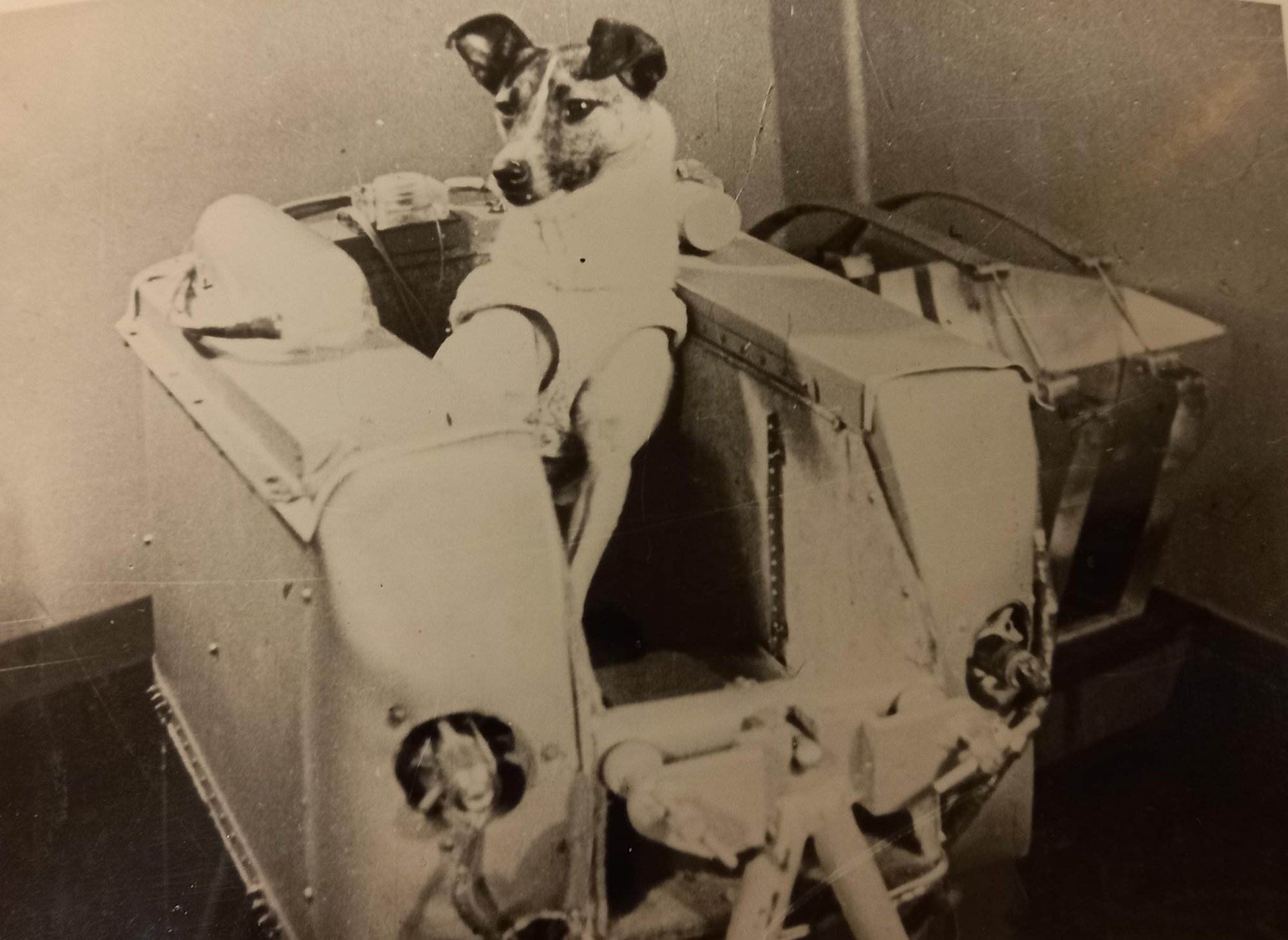
Laika in a mock cockpit

Yazdovsky made the final selection of dogs and their designated roles. Laika was to be the "flight dog" – a sacrifice to science on a one-way mission to space. Albina, who had already flown twice on a high-altitude test rocket, was to act as Laika's backup. She was not sent as the primary due to Albina recently giving birth to three pups, and thus Yazdovsky thought it cruel to send Albina as the primary and separate a mother from her children. The third dog, Mushka, was a "control dog" – she was to stay on the ground and be used to test instrumentation and life support.

Before leaving for the Baikonur Cosmodrome, Yazdovsky and Gazenko conducted surgery on the dogs, routing the cables from the transmitters to the sensors that would measure breathing, pulse, and blood pressure.

Because the existing airstrip at Turatam near the cosmodrome was small, the dogs and crew had to be first flown aboard a Tu‑104 plane to Tashkent. From there, a smaller and lighter Il‑14 plane took them to Turatam. Training of dogs continued upon arrival; one after another they were placed in the capsules to get familiar with the feeding system.

According to a NASA document, Laika was placed in the capsule of the satellite on 31 October 1957 – three days before the start of the mission. At that time of year, the temperatures at the launch site were extremely low, and a hose connected to a heater was used to keep her container warm. Two assistants were assigned to keep a constant watch on Laika before launch. Just prior to liftoff on 3 November 1957, from Baikonur Cosmodrome, Laika's fur was sponged in a weak ethanol solution and carefully groomed, while iodine was painted onto the areas where sensors would be placed to monitor her bodily functions.

One of the technicians preparing the capsule before final lift-off stated: "After placing Laika in the container and before closing the hatch, we kissed her nose and wished her bon voyage, knowing that she would not survive the flight."

== Voyage ==
Accounts of the time of launch vary from source to source, given as 05:30:42 or 07:22 Moscow Time.

At peak acceleration, Laika's respiration increased to between three and four times the pre-launch rate. The sensors showed her heart rate was 103 beats/min before launch and increased to 240 beats/min during the early acceleration. After reaching orbit, Sputnik 2's nose cone was jettisoned successfully; however, the "Block A" core did not separate as planned, preventing the thermal control system from operating correctly. Some of the thermal insulation tore loose, raising the cabin temperature to 40 °C (104 °F). After three hours of weightlessness, Laika's pulse rate had settled back to 102 beats/min, three times longer than it had taken during earlier ground tests, an indication of the stress she was under. The early telemetry indicated that Laika was agitated but eating her food. After approximately five to seven hours into the flight, no further signs of life were received from the spacecraft.

The Soviet scientists had planned to euthanise Laika with a serving of poisoned food. For many years, the Soviet Union gave conflicting statements that she had died either from asphyxia, when the batteries failed, or that she had been euthanised. Many rumours circulated about the exact manner of her death. In 1999, several Russian sources reported that Laika had died when the cabin overheated on the fourth day. In October 2002, Dimitri Malashenkov, one of the scientists behind the Sputnik 2 mission, revealed that Laika had died by the fourth circuit (Note: The satellite's orbit had a period of 103.7 minutes.) of flight from overheating. According to a paper he presented to the World Space Congress in Houston, Texas, "It turned out that it was practically impossible to create a reliable temperature control system in such limited time constraints."

Over five months later, after 2,570 orbits, Sputnik 2 disintegrated during re-entry on 14 April 1958.

== Ethics of animal testing ==
Due to the overshadowing issue of the Soviet–U.S. Space Race, the ethical issues raised by this experiment, which were a matter of concern in the West, went largely unaddressed for some time. As newspaper clippings from 1957 show, the press was initially focused on reporting the political perspective, while Laika's health and retrieval – or lack thereof – only became an issue later.

Sputnik 2 was not designed to be retrievable, and it had always been accepted that Laika would die. The mission sparked a debate across the globe on the mistreatment of animals and animal testing in general to advance science. In the United Kingdom, the National Canine Defence League called on all dog owners to observe a minute's silence on each day Laika remained in space, while the Royal Society for the Prevention of Cruelty to Animals (RSPCA) received protests even before Radio Moscow had finished announcing the launch. Animal rights groups at the time called on members of the public to protest at Soviet embassies. In the U.S., people demonstrated outside the United Nations in New York, and laboratory researchers offered some support for the Soviets, at least before the news of Laika's death.

In Warsaw Pact countries, open criticism of the Soviet space program was difficult because of political censorship, but there were notable cases of criticism in Polish scientific circles. A Polish scientific periodical, Kto, Kiedy, Dlaczego ("Who, When, Why"), published in 1958, discussed the mission of Sputnik 2. In the periodical's section dedicated to astronautics, Krzysztof Boruń described the Sputnik 2 mission as "regrettable" and criticised not bringing Laika back to Earth alive as "undoubtedly a great loss for science".

In the Soviet Union, there was less controversy. Neither the media, books in the following years, nor the public openly questioned the decision to send a dog into space. In 1998, after the collapse of the Soviet regime, Oleg Gazenko, one of the scientists responsible for sending Laika into space, expressed regret for allowing her to die:

Work with animals is a source of suffering to all of us. We treat them like babies who cannot speak. The more time passes, the more I'm sorry about it. We shouldn't have done it [...] We did not learn enough from this mission to justify the death of the dog.

Future space missions carrying dogs would be designed to be recovered; the first successful recovery followed the flight of Korabl-Sputnik 2, wherein the dogs Belka and Strelka, alongside dozens of other organisms, safely returned to Earth. Nonetheless, four other dogs later died in Soviet space missions: Bars and Lisichka were killed when their R‑7 rocket exploded shortly after launch on 28 July 1960, while Pchyolka and Mushka died when Korabl-Sputnik 3 suffered an emergency and had to be detonated.

== Tributes ==
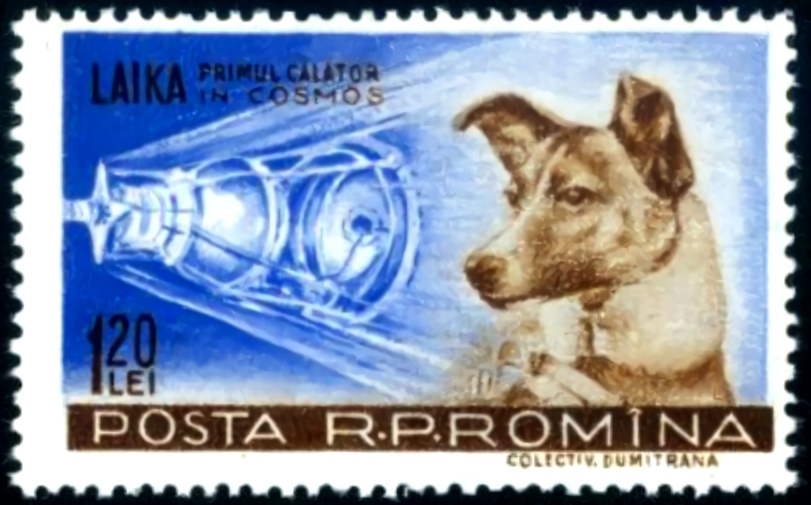
"Laika, first traveller into cosmos" stamp issued by Poșta Română in 1957

Laika is memorialised in the form of a statue and plaque at Star City, the Russian Cosmonaut training facility. Created in 1997, Laika is positioned behind the cosmonauts with her ears erect. The Monument to the Conquerors of Space in Moscow, constructed in 1964, also includes Laika. On 11 April 2008 at the military research facility where staff had been responsible for readying Laika for the flight, officials unveiled a monument of her poised on top of a space rocket. Stamps and envelopes picturing Laika were produced, as well as branded cigarette and matches.

In 1988 the Spanish band Mecano released the song "Laika" paying tribute to the flight of the dog. The end of the song alludes to Laika's death: "There is one less dog on the Earth / And one more star in the sky".

Karl Schroeder wrote a pessimistic near future science fiction novellette Laika's Ghost with the idea that in the pragmatic world, "only people ready to take up the dream of flight to other worlds are aged remnants of the former Soviet Union".

In 2005 the independent animated film studio Will Vinton Studios was rebranded to Laika after the dog.

The 2007 graphic novel Laika by Nick Abadzis won several awards, landing itself on the YALSA "Top Ten Great Graphic Novels for Teens".

Lajka is a 2017 Czech science fiction comedy animated film inspired by the dog.

Norwegian singer Emmy released a song in 2025 titled "Laika Party" to compete in the Irish Eurosong selection for the 2025 Eurovision Song Contest. The song tells a story about the singer wishing that Laika had never died and was living happily in space. Emmy won the selection to represent Ireland at the contest.

== Sources ==
- Dickson, Paul (2009), Sputnik: The Shock of the Century, Bloomsbury Publishing USA, ISBN 978-0-8027-1804-4
- Siddiqi, Asif. A. (2000), Challenge to Apollo: The Soviet Union and the Space Race, 1945–1974, NASA, Bibcode:2000ntrs.book88626S SP-2000-4408. Part 1 (page 1-500) Archived 16 September 2008 at the Wayback Machine, Part 2 (page 501-1011) Archived 14 July 2019 at the Wayback Machine.
- Chertok, Boris (2006). Rockets and People. Vol. II. CreateSpace Independent Publishing Platform. ISBN 9781470015084.
