= Claude Ruggieri =

French pyrotechnician

- Born: Claude-Eugène-Fortuné Ruggieri; 1777; Paris, France
- Died: 30 August 1841 (aged 63–64); Paris, France
- Known for: Fireworks, Rockets
- Spouse: Catherine Antoinette Lagrange

Claude Ruggieri (1777 – 30 August 1841) was a pyrotechnician in Paris, France, who developed and wrote about innovations in fireworks design. He and others in his family were renowned and patronized by royalty for their creation of great fireworks extravaganzas. They also opened a public pleasure garden where fireworks displays could be enjoyed by the people of Paris. The Ruggieris introduced a style of fireworks that was theatrical rather than being based on military gunnery.

Following a disastrous fireworks accident on 30 May 1770, the Ruggieris fell from favor. Claude-Fortuné Ruggieri was primarily responsible for restoring the family to its position of prominence. He used the new science of chemistry to develop novel fireworks, in particular colored fireworks that distinguished the Ruggieris from their rivals. He discovered a way to reliably create a vivid "green fire" observed in Russian fireworks. In his writings, Claude Ruggieri discussed "aerial philosophy", the composition and reactions of gases or "airs". He emphasized the importance of chemistry as a form of theoretical knowledge and connected it to the artisanal practices of pyrotechnics.

Claude Ruggieri was a friend of André-Jacques Garnerin, the Official Aeronaut of France, and experimented with both balloons and rockets. Ruggieri is credited with being the first person to use rockets to transport living passengers aloft. His passengers were mostly mice and rats, but also sheep. He used parachutes to return them safely to the earth.

== Family ==
Claude-Eugène-Fortuné Ruggieri was born in 1777, to Petronio and Jeanne-Elizabeth Ruggieri. The Ruggieris were an Italian family who had become naturalized citizens of France. The five Ruggieri brothers (Antonio, Francesco, Gaetano, Petronio and Pietro) left Bologna, Italy, for Paris, France, in 1743. They came from a tradition in which fireworks were used as part of theatre, and accompanied the Comédie Italienne to Paris. Their spectacles pyriques, fireworks mounted on fixed and moving iron armatures, were set off between acts of the theatrical performance. Soon the displays became entertainments in their own right, carefully crafted presentations that referenced history and mythology.

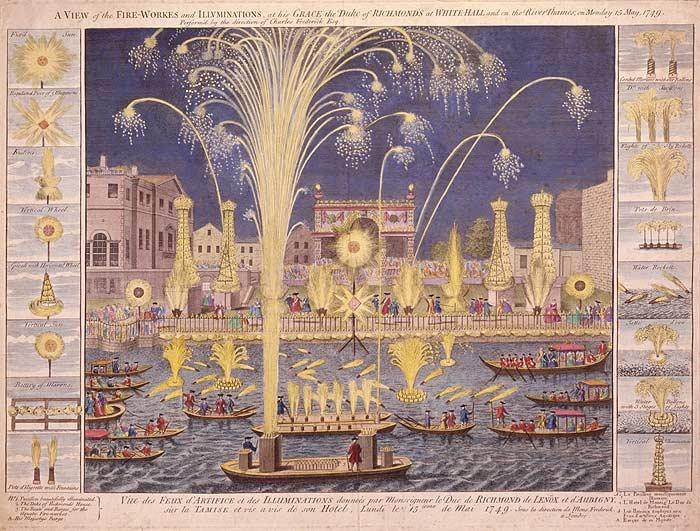
Royal Fire-workes and Illuminations in Whitehall and on the River Thames, for King George II of Great Britain, May 15, 1749

The Ruggieris were appointed artificiers du Roi to King Louis XV. The family thrived as fireworks pyrotechnicians under the patronage of royalty. Louis XV (1710–1774) patronized the elder Ruggieri brothers. Gaetano Ruggieri served King George II of Great Britain. Petronio Ruggieri (−1794) had two sons, Michel-Marie (−1849) and Claude-Fortuné. Michel-Marie and Claude-Fortuné designed and exploded elaborate fireworks displays for Napoleon I, Louis XVIII, and Charles X.

In August 1764, Giovani Battista Torre (a.k.a. Jean-Baptiste Torré) established a pleasure garden on the boulevard Saint-Martin in Paris. It was known as the Waux-hall de Torré, or Waux-hall d'été, after Vauxhall Gardens in London. Torré held public fireworks displays that included artificial volcanoes. In 1766, Pietro Ruggieri became the "dignified rival" of Torre by opening his own Jardin Ruggieri at 20, rue Neuve-Saint-Lazare, catering to the Parisien public. After his death in 1778, ownership passed to his brother Petronio. It was taken over by Michel-Marie and Claude-Fortuné Ruggieri in 1794.

In subsequent generations, Michel's son François Ruggieri (1796–1862) served as a pyrotechnician to Mehemet Ali, viceroy of Egypt. Claude-Fortuné's son, Désiré-François Ruggieri (1818–1885) became the head of the family business in France, acting as a pyrotechnician for Napoleon III. The Ruggieri family business is still in operation in France.

== Work ==
=== Fireworks ===
On 30 May 1770, a display planned by Petronio Ruggieri to celebrate the marriage of the future Louis XVI and Marie Antoinette ended in a disastrous accident. In response, the City of Paris slashed its budget for fireworks, cutting off the Ruggieri family's main source of income.

Claude-Fortuné Ruggieri was primarily responsible for restoring the family to a position of prominence, by using the new science of chemistry to develop novel fireworks that distinguished the Ruggieris from their rivals. Ruggieri was a leader in prioritizing color as an important element of fireworks displays, and emphasized the importance of chemistry as a theoretical basis for creating colored fireworks:

Pyrotechny... is a dark chaos which one cannot penetrate without the torch of chemistry – Claude-Fortuné Ruggieri

Before Ruggieri, the default color for fireworks was a brilliant "white fire", also known as "natural fire". Practitioners sometimes attempted to color their fireworks, generally by adding materials of the target color (e.g. indigo for blue), achieving at best a faint coloration. The Ruggieris first attempted to develop colored fire in 1766 with the help of chemist Antoine Lavoisier. Lavoisier reported only very limited success in his attempts to make yellow, blue, and green fire.

There were reports that a brilliant "green fire" had been created in the 1700s, most successfully by Mikhail Vasil'evich Danilov and Matvei Martynov at the Russian court. However, other practitioners found it difficult to recreate such effects. In 1804, after hearing a first-person account of Russian green fire, Claude Ruggieri began to experiment with the addition of metallic salts to create colored flames.

Ruggieri took four parts of verdigris (copper carbonate) and two parts blue vitriol (copper sulphate) and one part sal-ammoniac (ammonium chloride). He mixed them together and added alcohol, then dipped cotton threads into the wet paste and hung them on the figure of a palm tree to make the leaves appear to burn green. The sal-ammoniac volatilized the metal salts to increase the intensity of the colour. – Simon Werrett

Ruggieri claimed to first use green fire publicly in June 1810, as part of a fireworks display for the marriage of Napoleon I and Marie Louise, Duchess of Parma.

Drawing for the temple of Hymen, a firework display to celebrate the marriage of Napoleon and Marie Louise at the Residence of Princess Pauline Borghèse, the Palais De Neuilly, 1810

Ruggieri wrote a number of works which were translated into English and German as well as being published in French. Ruggieri's first book, Elémens De Pyrotechnie (1801, 1811, 1821) was dedicated to Jean-Antoine Chaptal, the author of Elémens De Chimie, and a minister in Napoleon's government. In this way, Ruggieri aligned himself with a post-revolutionary view of science. Chaptal was a proponent of a "new man" who connected theoretical knowledge and artisanal skills.

Elémens De Pyrotechnie was filled with discussions of chemistry and physics. Ruggieri discussed "aerial philosophy", drawing on some of Joseph Priestley's ideas about the composition and reactions of gases or "airs". However, Ruggieri did not identify key differences between Phlogiston theory and Lavoisier's Caloric theory of combustion.

At the same time, the book is filled with practical descriptions and detailed diagrams about the construction and use of fireworks. Writing in 1922, Alan Brock describes Ruggieri as "the first author to deal with the subject in such a way as to convince the professional reader of the practical knowledge of the subject."

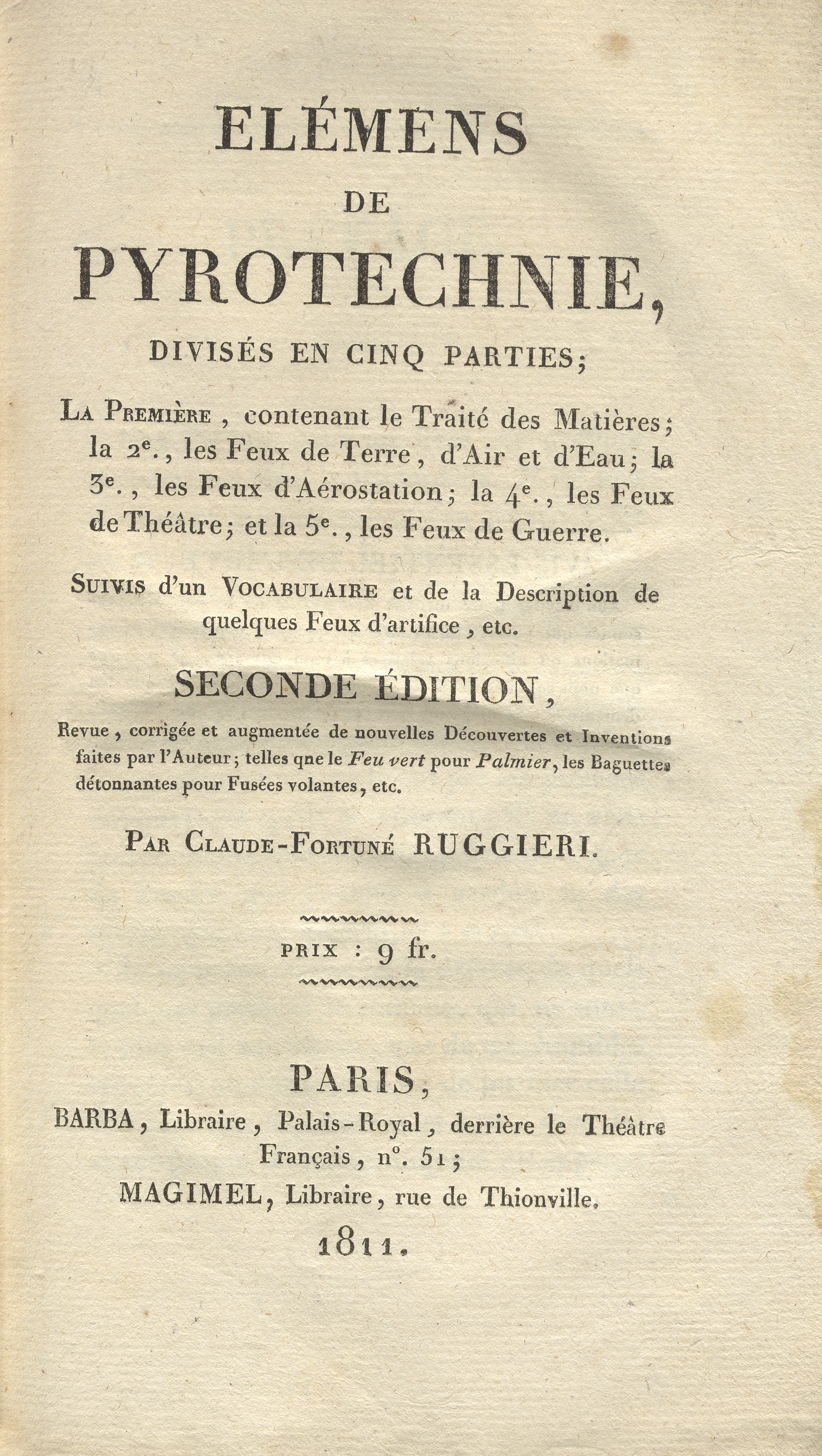
Elémens De Pyrotechnie, title page, 1811

Plate 1, Laboratory bench equipment

Plate 25, Armatures for fireworks

Plate 26, Palm tree of green fire

=== Balloons, rockets and parachutes ===
Claude Ruggieri was a friend of André-Jacques Garnerin, the Official Aeronaut of France, who held balloon ascensions in the Ruggieri's pleasure garden. In 1801, Garnerin and Ruggieri celebrated Bastille Day with a combined balloon ascension and fireworks display.

In addition to experimenting with balloons, Claude Ruggieri used rockets to transport living passengers aloft and parachutes to return them safely to the earth. As early as 1806, Ruggieri sent mice and rats up in rockets, recovering them through the use of parachutes. He also apparently sent a sheep about 600 feet up in the air, bringing it back down with parachutes. As a result, Ruggieri is credited with being the first person to use rockets to carry living creatures.

In 1830, Ruggieri announced that he would use a large cluster of rockets to lift a larger animal, a ram, into the air. A young man (perhaps as young as 11) apparently offered to replace the ram as a passenger in the test. Plans were made for him to ascend from the Champ de Mars. However, French authorities intervened and canceled the flight, apparently due to the volunteer's youth.

== Death ==
Ruggieri died at number 88, Rue de Clichy, Paris, France, on 30 August 1841. His widow was Catherine Antoinette Lagrange, whom he had married in 1819.

== Publications ==
- Ruggieri, Claude-Fortuné (1801). Elémens de pyrotechnie : divisés en cinq parties; la première, contenant le traité des matières; la 2e., les feux de terre, d'air et d'eau; la 3e., les feux d'aérostation; la 4e., les feux de théâtre; et la 5e., les feux de guerre. Suivis d'un vocabulaire et de la description de quelques feux d'artifice, etc. Paris, France: Barba, libraire, Palais-Royal, derrièâtre français, no. 51; : Magimel, libraire, rue de Thionville. Editions appeared in 1801, 1811, and 1821.
- Ruggieri, Claude Fortuné (1812). Pyrotechnie militaire, ou, Traité complet des feux de guerre et des bouches à feu : contenant l'origine de la pyrotechnie militaire, les principes chimiques et mécaniques pour composer, préparer et lancer les machines incendiairies à l'usage des arsenaux de terre et de mer; un Précis des bouches à feu; un Abrégé de la fortification, de la défense, de l'attaque, etc. / suivi d'un vocabulaireerre et des bouches à feu. Paris: Chez l'auteur.
- Ruggieri, Claude-Fortuné; Bachelier, Charles-Louis-Étienne; Barba, Jean-Nicolas; David, Joseph-Denis; Delaunay, Simon-César (1830). Précis historique sur les fêtes, les spectacles et les réjouissances publiques : contenant sommairement: l'institution des fêtes chez quelques peuples de l'antiquité; le couronnement et le sacre des souverains; les fêtes en général, et leurs particularités; les jeux scéniques, et les divertissemens accessoires; les descriptions des fêtes et des réjouissances publiques les plus remarquables, depuis Henri IV jusqu'au sacre de Charles X. Paris: Chez l'auteur, rue de Clichy, no 88. Bachelier, libraire, quai des Augustins. Delaunay, libraire, au Palais-Royal. Barba, au Palais-Royal, Galerie de Chartres.
