= Franz Helm =

German artillery master (c. 1500 – 1567)

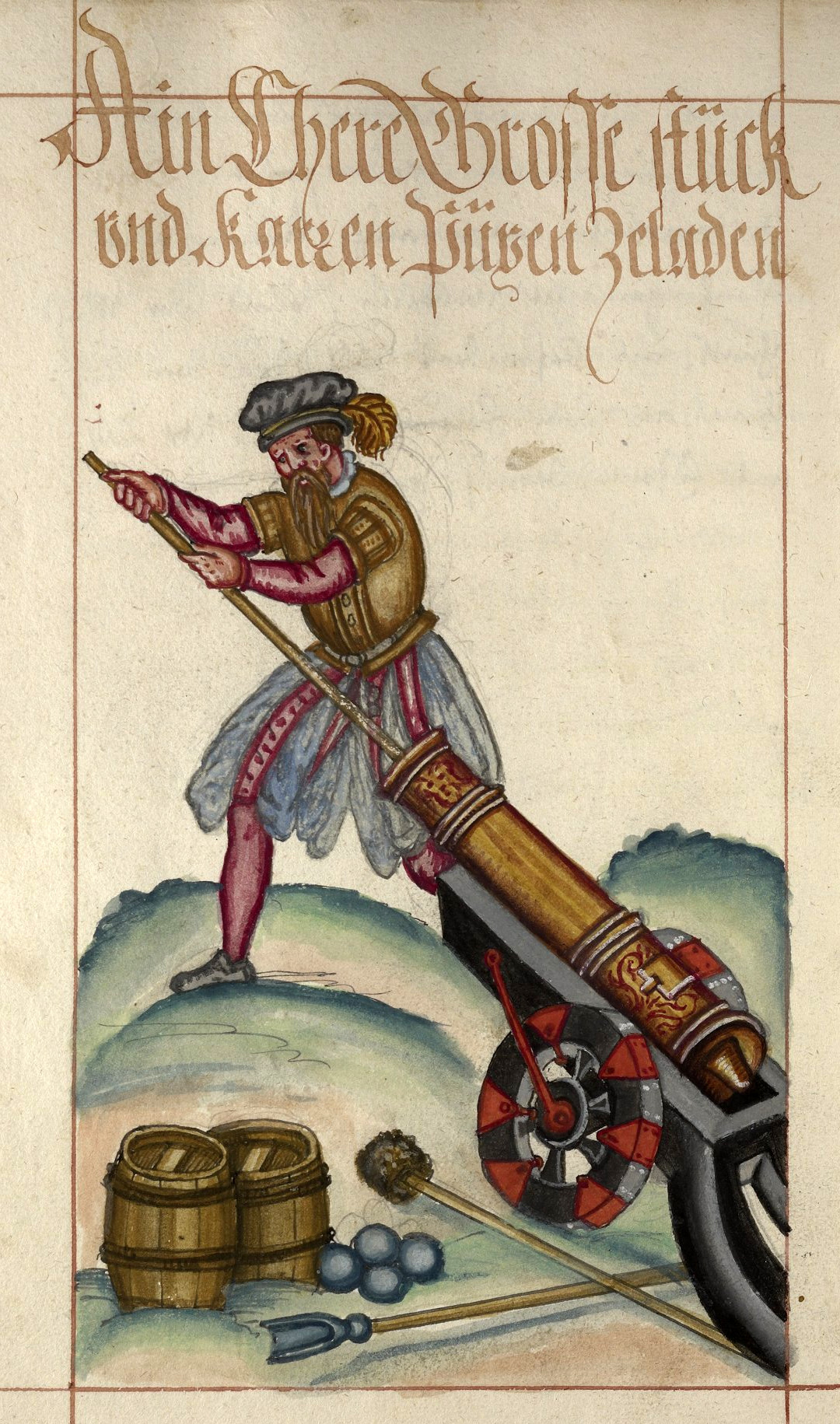
Illustration of a man loading a cannon, from a 1584 copy of Helm's Buch von den probierten Künsten

Franz Helm (c. 1500 – 1567) was an artillery master who lived and worked in what is now Germany in the first half of the 16th century. By his own account, he was born in Cologne, perhaps around 1500. Described as a "shooter, cannonier and fireworker," Helm fought with the armies of the Holy Roman Emperor Charles V against the Ottoman Empire. He subsequently moved to Landshut in the then Duchy of Bavaria, where he served the dukes William IV, Louis X and Albert V. He later served John II, Count Palatine of Simmern.

== Works ==
Two of Helm's works have survived to the present day. In the 1520s he wrote a comprehensive description of an 'ideal' armoury which, though it has not survived as a stand-alone work, is found incorporated into some texts of his later surviving work, the Buch von den probierten Künsten ("Book of the practical arts"). This was given in manuscript form to his patron, Duke Albert V, some years before the end of Helm's career. Whether it had any practical influence on the duke's army is unclear but it is possible that the later construction of the royal armoury at Munich's Marstallplatz followed Helm's recommendations. The book follows a format that had become quite traditional by that point, albeit with the inclusion of modern elements. It is organised in the same fashion as the highly influential Feuerwerkbuch of 1420, reproducing many of the earlier book's instructions verbatim. Helm writes in several places that he had drawn on old "art books" in compiling his own book. Although he treats the older material respectfully, he does not shy away from criticising outdated methods – for instance, describing some old-style artillery pieces as curiosities and calling one method of shooting described in the Feuerwerkbuch as "strange" – and provides updated information on modern methods and equipment. In various places, he explicitly calls new artillery methods "novel" and "superior". Although his book circulated widely in manuscript form, it was not until 1625 that it appeared in print under the title Armamentarium principale oder Kriegsmunition und Artillerie-Buch ("Principles of armament, or book of war munitions and artillery").

== Rocket cat ==
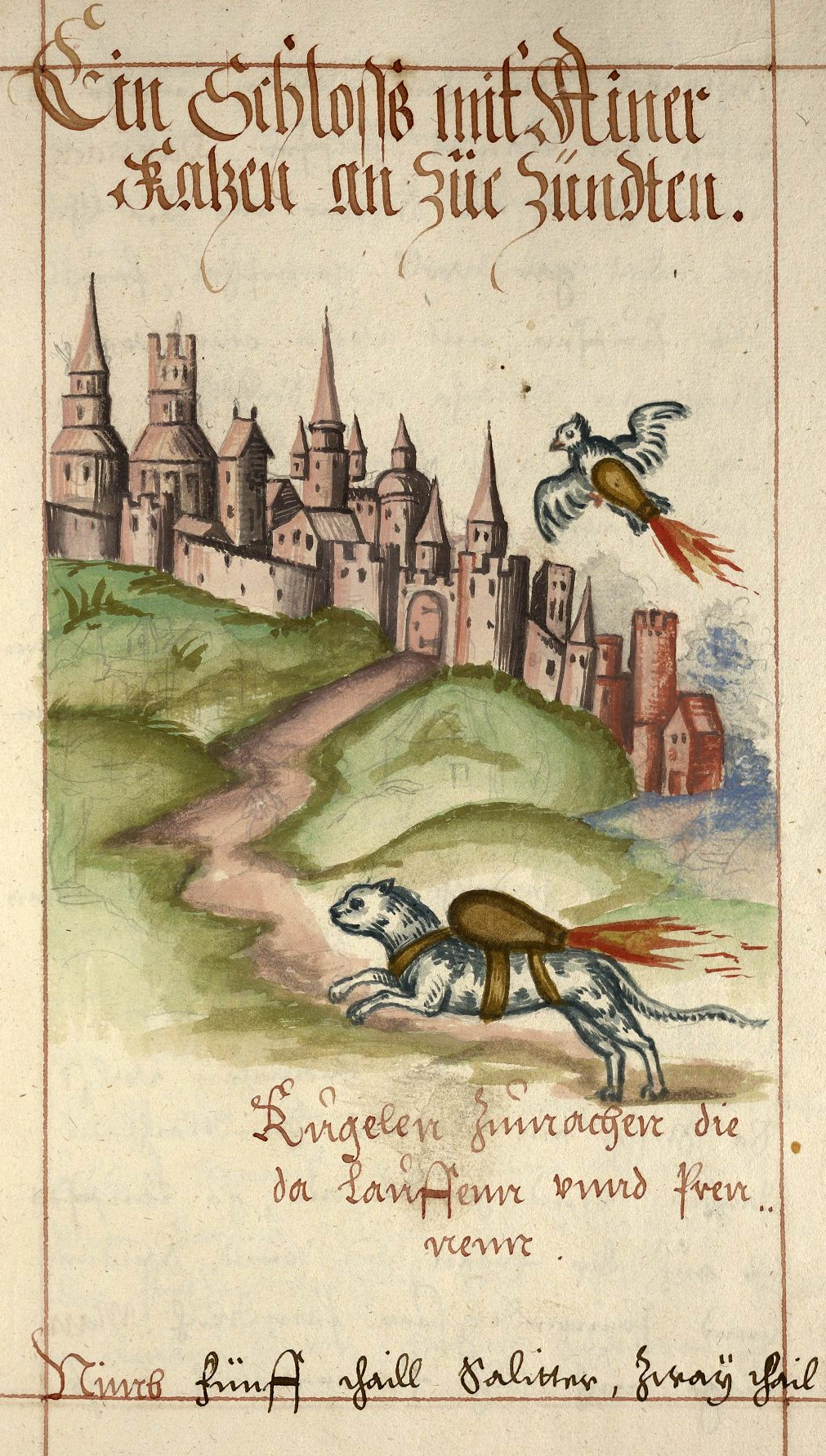
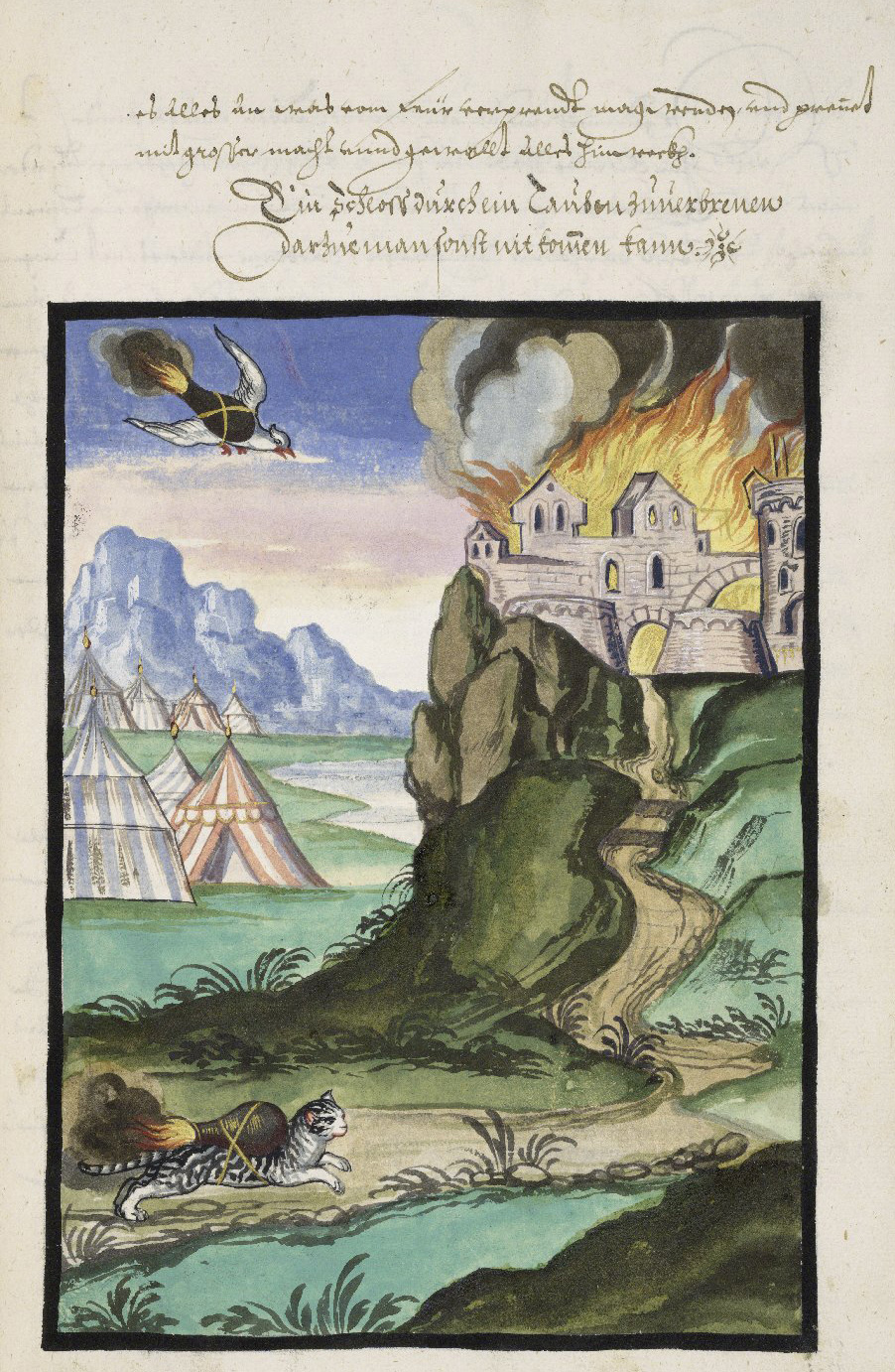
Two illustrations (from 1584 and 1607) of Helm's concept of a 'rocket cat' and dove

One method described by Helm has attracted attention for its illustration of what has been dubbed a 'rocket cat' – a feline with what appears to be a rocket on its back propelling it towards a castle or fortified town. The same illustration also shows what appears to be a rocket-propelled dove. The illustration appears in various forms in different manuscript versions of Helm's book, as well as in the 1625 printed edition. The images appear in a section titled "To set fire to a castle or city which you can't get at otherwise," in which Helm describes ways of using incendiary devices strapped to animals to set fortified places on fire. He writes:

Create a small sack like a fire-arrow ... if you would like to get at a town or castle, seek to obtain a cat from that place. And bind the sack to the back of the cat, ignite it, let it glow well and thereafter let the cat go, so it runs to the nearest castle or town, and out of fear it thinks to hide itself where it ends up in barn hay or straw it will be ignited.

Mitch Fraas of the University of Pennsylvania, which has a copy of Helm's manuscript, writes that "there is no way to know if Helm himself ever employed this method of pyrotechnic warfare." He describes it as "sort of a harebrained scheme. It seems like a really terrible idea, and very unlikely the animals would run back to where they came from. More likely they'd set your own camp on fire."

The concept was until the 18th century circulated. But Helm was not the first to propose or use incendiary animals; the Biblical figure Samson is described as attaching torches to the tails of three hundred foxes, leaving the panicked beasts to run through the fields of the Philistines, burning all in their wake. Early Sanskrit texts, early Scandinavian sources and the Primary Chronicle mention cats and birds bearing incendiary devices, while the 10th century Chinese manual Hu Chhien Ching and its 11th century successor Wu Ching Tsung Yao describe and illustrate a series of "fire animals". These include "apricot-stone fire sparrows" carrying burning tinders attached to their legs inside an apricot stone, with the hope that they would fly into the enemy's granaries and set them on fire, and "magic-fire flying crows", artificial birds powered by four rocket tubes. Most often Chinese or Japanese sources talked about forcing oxen or horses for attacks. The 10th-century regent Olga of Kiev is described in the Primary Chronicle as using flaming birds to wreak revenge on the Drevlyans for killing her husband Igor:

Olga requested three pigeons and three sparrows from each household [of the Drevlyans]. Having gathered these birds Olga gave to each soldier in her army a pigeon or a sparrow, and ordered them to attach by a thread to each pigeon and sparrow a piece of sulphur bound with small pieces of cloth. When night fell, Olga bade her soldiers release the pigeons and the sparrows. So the birds flew to their nests, the pigeons to the cotes, and the sparrows under the eaves. Thus the dove-cotes, the coops, the porches, and the haymows were set on fire. There was not a house that was not consumed, and it was impossible to extinguish the flames, because all the houses caught fire at once.

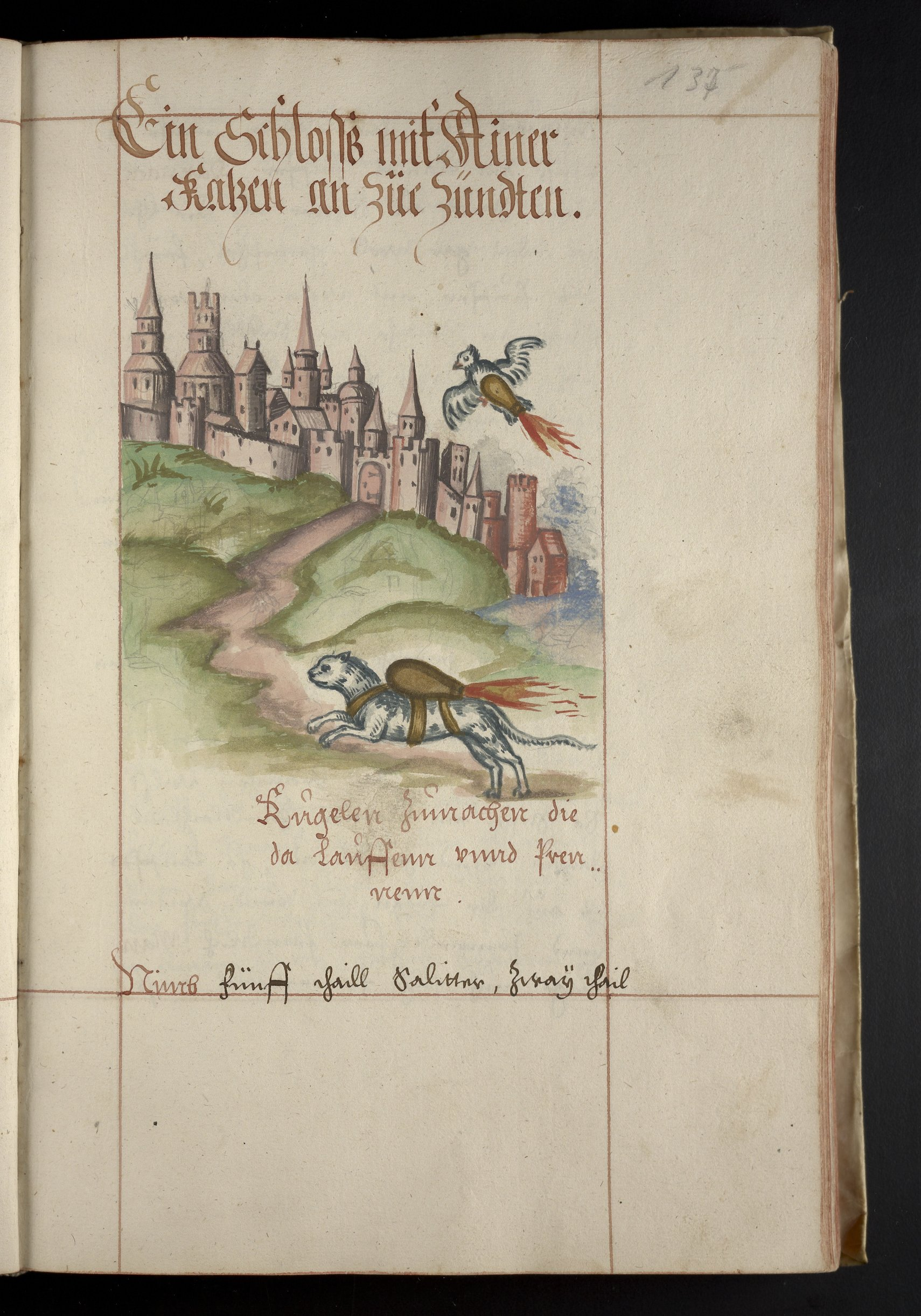
UPenn Ms. Codex 109, f137r.

== See also ==
- Animal-borne bomb attacks
- Bat bomb
- Conrad Haas
