= Belka and Strelka =

Soviet animals sent to space

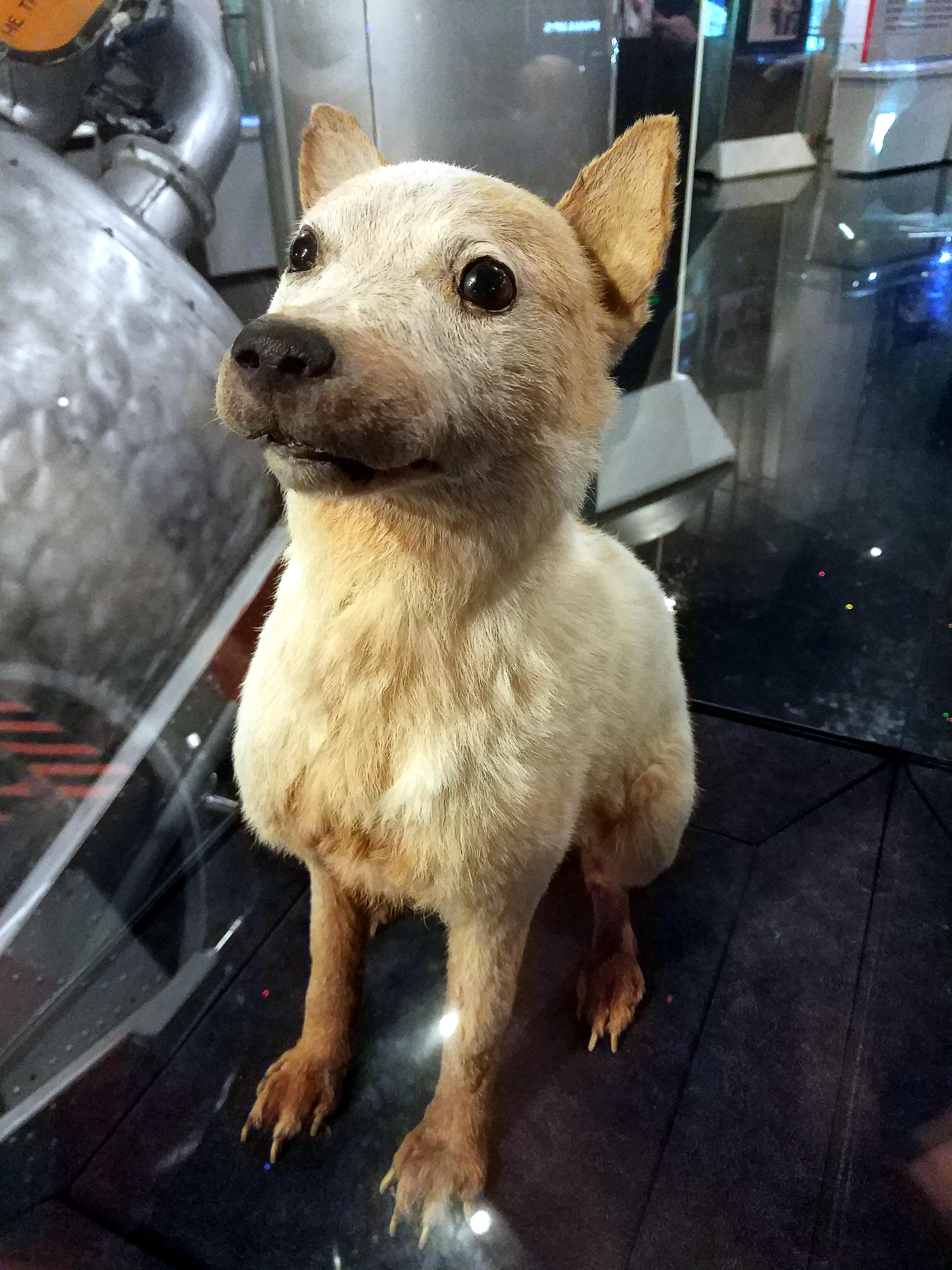
Belka (stuffed)

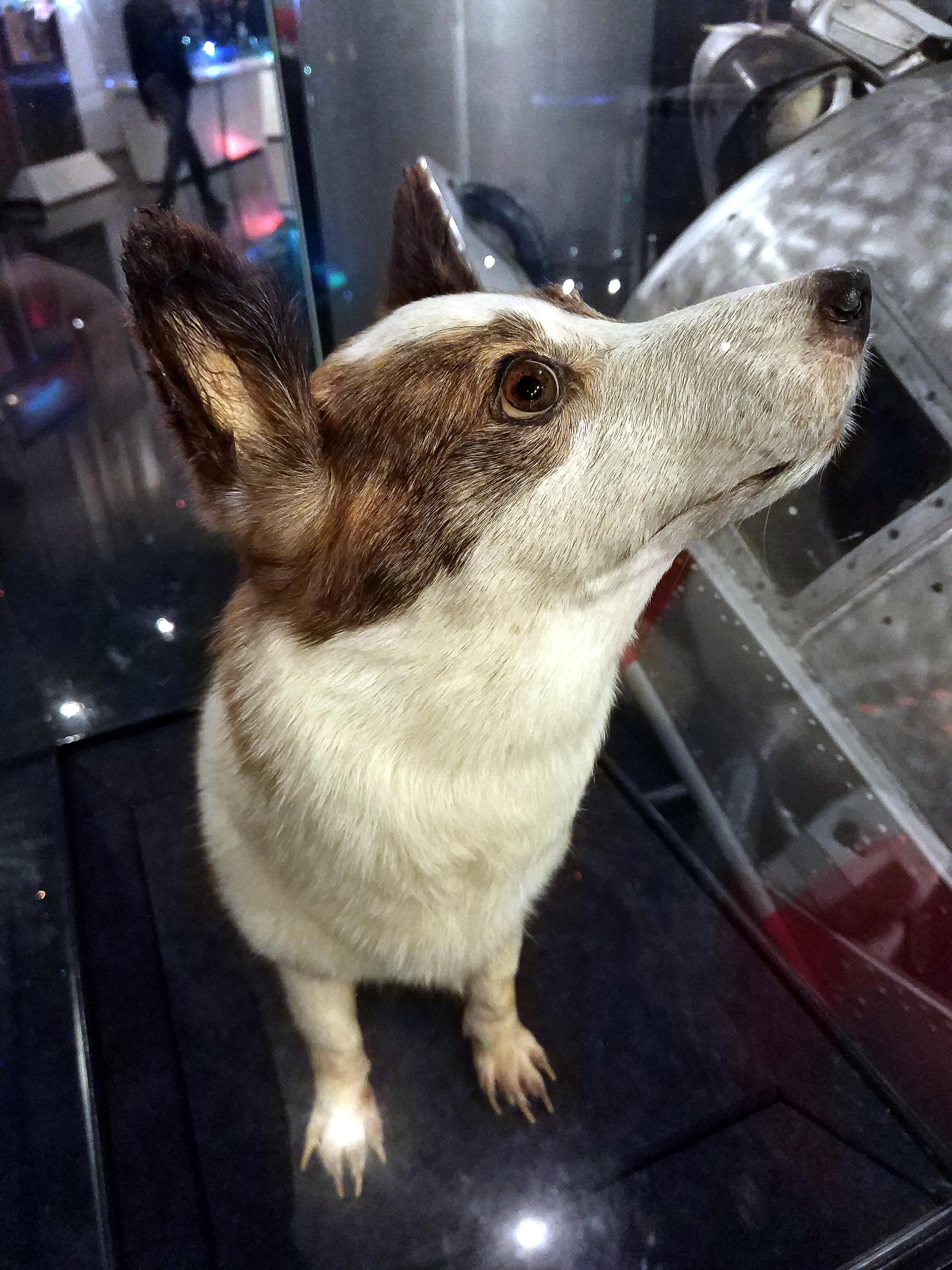
Strelka (stuffed)

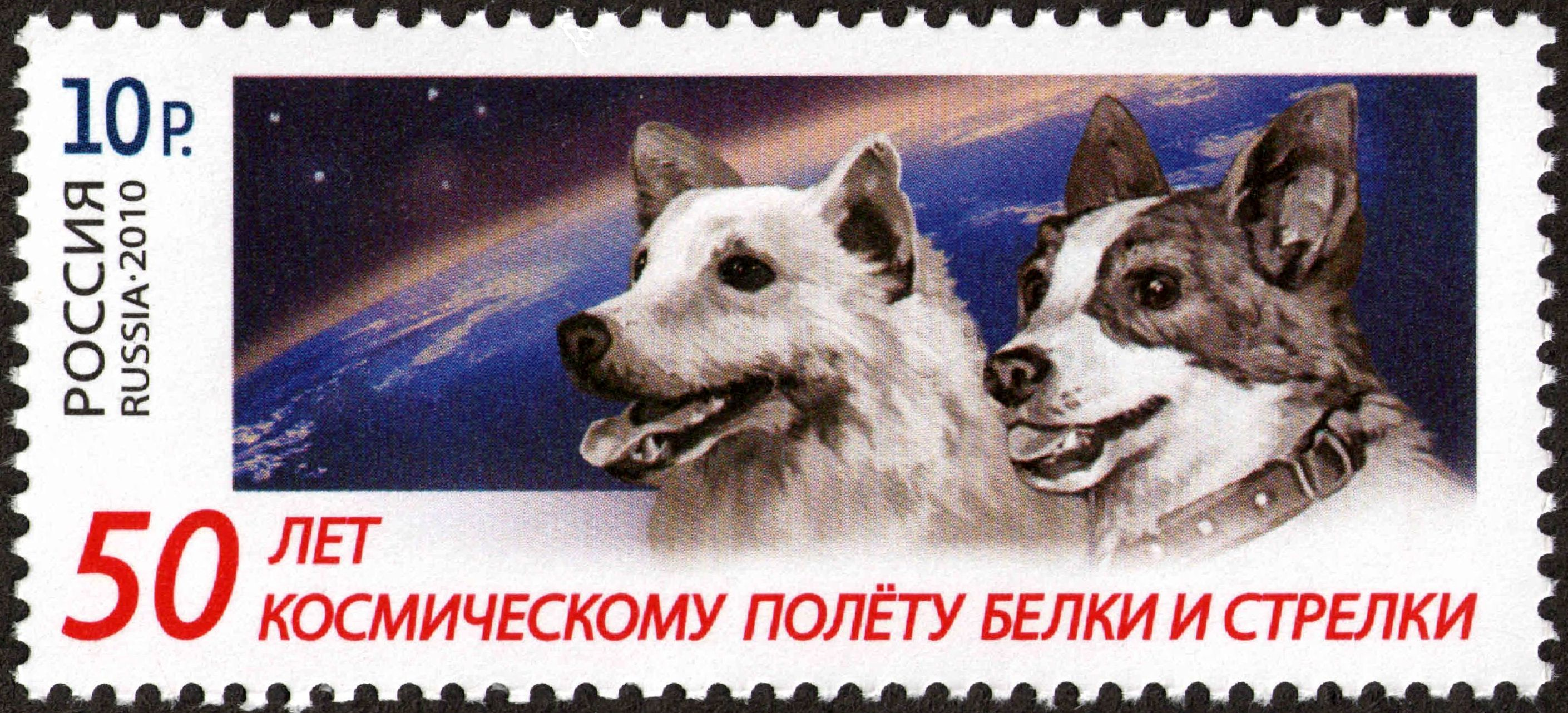
Belka and Strelka on a 2010 stamp of Russia, released to celebrate the 50th anniversary of their spaceflight

Belka (Белка, literally, "squirrel", or alternatively "Whitey") and Strelka (Стрелка, "Arrow") were dogs that spent a day in space aboard Korabl-Sputnik 2 (Sputnik 5), launched on 19 August 1960, before safely returning to Earth. They were the first higher living organisms to survive an orbital trip in outer space.

They were accompanied by 42 mice, a grey rabbit, two rats, flies, and several plants and fungi. All passengers survived. Sputnik 5 made 17 revolutions around the Earth and spent 27 hours in orbit. These were the first Earth-born creatures to orbit Earth and return alive following earlier successful suborbital space flights, including fruit flies launched into space by the U.S. in 1947, and the launch of Dezik and Tsygan in 1951, among other Soviet space dogs.

The objective of the mission was to check and understand the organisms' reactions to exposure to zero gravity in outer space.

Strelka went on to have six puppies with a male dog named Pushok who participated in many ground-based space experiments, but never made it into space. One of the puppies was named Pushinka (Пушинка, "Fluffy") and was presented to President John F. Kennedy by Nikita Khrushchev in 1961. A Kennedy dog named Charlie and Pushinka mated, resulting in the birth of four puppies that JFK referred to jokingly as pupniks. Two of their puppies, Butterfly and Streaker, were given away to children in the Midwest. The other two puppies, White Tips and Blackie, stayed at the Kennedy home on Squaw Island but were eventually given away to family friends. Pushinka's descendants were still living as of 2024. A photo of descendants of some of the Space Dogs is on display at the Zvezda Museum in Tomilino outside Moscow.

A Russian animated feature film called Belka and Strelka: Star Dogs (English title: Space Dogs) was released in 2010.

== See also ==
- Animals in space
- Soviet space dogs
- List of individual dogs
