= Fruit flies in space =

First Earthlings launched into space

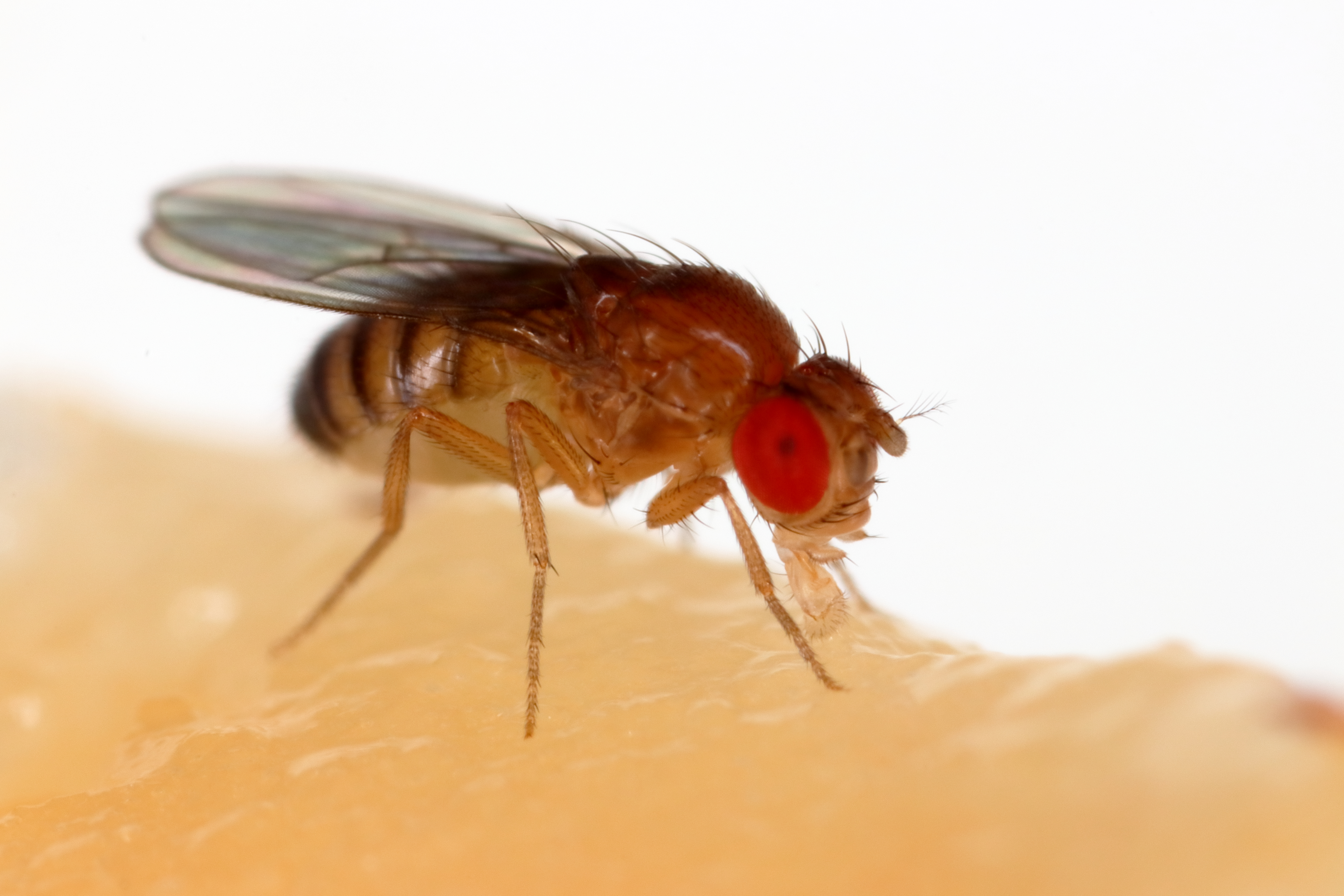
Drosophila melanogaster, the common fruit fly, has been used to study the effects of spaceflight on living organisms.

On a July 9, 1946, suborbital V-2 rocket flight, fruit flies became the first living organisms to go to space, and on February 20, 1947, fruit flies safely returned from a suborbital space flight, which paved the way for human exploration. Years before sending mammals into space, such as the 1949 flight of the rhesus monkey Albert II, the Soviet space dogs, or humans, scientists studied Drosophila melanogaster (the common fruit fly) and its reactions to both radiation and space flight to understand the possible effects of space and a zero-gravity environment on humans. Starting in the 1910s, researchers conducted experiments on fruit flies because humans and fruit flies share many genes.

At the height of the Cold War and the Space Race, flies were sent on missions to space with great frequency, allowing scientists to study the nature of living and breeding in space. Scientists and researchers from the Soviet Union and the United States both used fruit flies for their research and missions. These flies were used to further the understanding of the effects of weightlessness on the cardiovascular system, the immune system, and the genes of astronauts.

== Background ==
Even after the Space Race was completed, advancements in space travel continued. Researchers continue to study the ability of life to survive in the harsh atmosphere of space, promote commercial development, expand and advance knowledge, and prepare future generations for exploration. Throughout time, Animals in space have ensured suitable conditions for human exploration. Larger animals including dogs, monkeys, cats, mice, tortoises and others, have been vital to many excursions, as have insects, despite many space animals not returning to Earth after the experiments conclude.

The fruit fly has frequently been utilized for space travel, due to its comparable genetics to that of humans. The short gestation period and quick maturing process allows their continued use. Additionally, a female fruit fly can lay one hundred eggs daily, and each egg requires less than ten days to fully mature. Since three-quarters of its genome compares to other organisms, fruit flies frequently proceed with humans in space travel because their entire genetic makeup, including the sex chromosomes, have been sequenced by scientists.

== History ==
=== Pre-1930 ===
Scientists began using fruit flies for research as early as 1907. The first fruit fly research was performed by Thomas Hunt Morgan. He exposed flies to radiation and realized that they were a medical miracle, in the sense that they provided test results that are very often mirrored across many other species of animals. He studied fifteen different types of fruit flies, including the fruit fly most widely known, the Drosophila melanogaster. He established the "fly room" at the University of Columbia, dedicated and reserved to all the research being conducted on flies.

=== 1930s ===
In the 1930s, Dobzhanksy used research from Charles Darwin. Rather than focusing on the idea of survival of the fittest, Dobzhanksy focused on gene pools. Even though fruit flies are very small, they had the largest chromosomes that scientists had yet observed, making his research groundbreaking. In 1933, Thomas Hunt Morgan won a Nobel Prize for his research in medicine using flies. In 1935, Albert William Stevens and Orvil Arson Anderson ascended to 72,395 feet in a special balloon aircraft, and they carried fruit flies on their flight with them.

=== 1946 and 1947, first spaceflights carrying Earthlings ===
On July 9 1946, the first fruit flies reached space but were not recovered. On February 20, 1947, the United States sent a V-2 rocket containing fruit flies into space to study the effects of radiation on living organisms and to see if the radiation from space would be a potential problem for future astronauts. The flight was launched from White Sands Missile Range in New Mexico and lasted a total of three minutes. All the flies returned to Earth untouched by radiation. These flies paved the way for space-bound monkeys in 1949, dogs in 1951, and eventually humans in 1961.

=== 1950s ===
In February 1953, the United States launched several unmanned balloons containing fruit flies in various experiments. Most of the flies died or were never recovered, but twelve flies survived one flight on February 26, 1953. In February 1956, an unmanned balloon carrying mice, guinea pigs, a fungus sample, and some fruit flies reached an altitude of 115,000 feet. The mission proved successful: all the animals were recovered alive. In July 1958, the United States Navy launched Malcolm David Ross, Morton Lee Lewis, and fruit flies in a manned high-altitude balloon to 82,000 feet. This was the first flight that reached the stratosphere, where the cabin of the balloon mimicked the pressurized conditions found at a sea-level environment.

=== 1960s ===
In 1961, the first humans were sent to space. In 1968, scientists found that fruit fly larvae exposed to both radiation and space flight had a higher rate of premature death compared to fruit flies that were only exposed to radiation or fruit flies that only went to space. The same study showed that the flies exposed to both radiation and space flight also experienced accelerated aging and genetic mutations. A different 1968 study with the same general premise of exposing fruit flies to both pre-flight radiation and space flight showed that flies exposed to both had significant damage to their sperm, as opposed to flies exposed to only one or the other.

=== 1970s ===
A 1978 publication included several key findings that were critical for scientists studying fruit flies sent into space. First, fruit flies who were born and spent their first few days in space had a shorter lifespan than Earth-bound flies. Second, the development process of flies born in space and living flies sent to space was regular. Third, the wings of flies that were sent to space were either physically damaged (most likely due to the nature of the takeoff and landing of the Space Shuttle and not because of the micro-gravitational environment) or genetically damaged, since flies born in space did not produce as much glycogen in their wings, thus inhibiting their ability to fly.

=== 1980s ===
In 1981, Soviet scientists concluded that flies which were exposed to radiation before they were sent into orbit were far more likely to have offspring that exhibited genetic mutations than fruit flies that were only exposed to radiation or fruit flies that were only sent to space.

=== 1990s ===
In 1997, researchers sent fruit flies into space for eight days and mated them with earthbound fruit flies upon their return. They then produced male fruit flies that were three times as likely to carry lethal mutations on the Y-chromosome. These researchers suggested that the mutations were a result of the radiation found in space.

=== 2000s ===
A 2006 study found that fruit flies born in space were more vulnerable and susceptible to illness, and had a far weaker immune system compared to fruit flies born on Earth. This study confirmed to scientists that any plans for the Moon or Mars colonization would need to include countermeasures to boost astronauts' immune systems against infections like sepsis.

=== 2010s ===
In 2012, Dr. Richard Hill used a powerful magnet that simulated a zero-gravity experience to study the effect on fruit flies. Hill found that the flies' speed increased and that instead of floating, the flies moved in a motion similar to walking. The effect of weightlessness on fruit flies that Dr. Hill studied can give researchers valuable insights to the effects of weightlessness on humans since humans and fruit flies have very similar genes. In 2015, scientists from the Sanford Burnham Prebys Medical Discovery Institute found that fruit flies sent to space experienced changes in their genes that controlled their hearts and other cardiovascular structures. In 2017, the same scientists sent 30 live fruit flies with 2,000 fruit fly eggs to further research on the effects of zero-gravity on the heart and cardiovascular system. They found that the hearts of fruit flies that lived in space for several weeks were anatomically different from the hearts of earthbound fruit flies. From this study, scientists concluded that plans for Moon or Mars colonization would also have to include specific plans to protect astronauts' hearts.

=== 2020s and ongoing ===
With the technological advancements that exist today, space-like conditions can be replicated on Earth. This allows research to continue regarding the supposed effects of space travel on organisms and their body systems, without the costly nature of space expeditions. While technology advances, the fruit fly is continually used in preliminary research regarding space travel and organisms. Based on past research stating the dangerous consequences of space travel on blood flow and heart health, current research is being conducted. With time, research specialists hope to find results to combat these negative side effects and promote safe space travel.

== See also ==
- Zond 5, 1968 USSR Moon mission which carried fruit fly eggs
- Animals in space
