= Vegetable soup (disambiguation) =

Vegetable soup may refer to:

- Vegetable soup, a vegetable-based soup
- "Vegetable Soup" (song), a song released on the 2003 album Whoo Hoo! Wiggly Gremlins! by The Wiggles
- Vegetable Soup (TV series), an American children's television program airing on PBS and NBC from 1975 to 1978

== See also ==
- List of vegetable soups
- Vegetable (disambiguation)
- Soup (disambiguation)
