= Astrobotany =

Study of plants grown in spacecraft

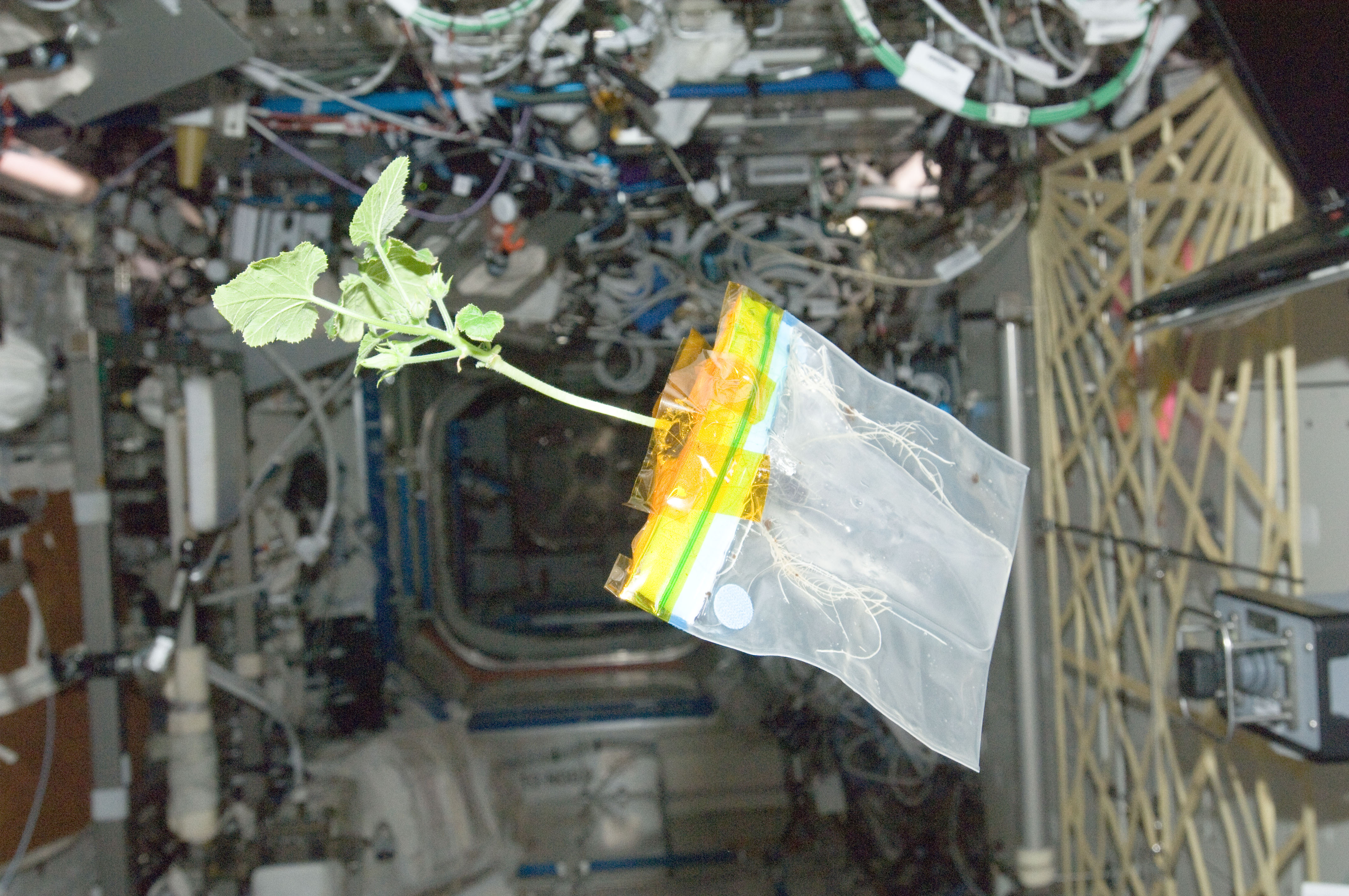
A zucchini being grown on the International Space Station

Astrobotany is an applied sub-discipline of botany that is the study of plants in space environments. It is a branch of astrobiology and botany.

Astrobotany concerns both the study of extraterrestrial vegetation discovery, as well as research into the growth of terrestrial vegetation in outer space by humans.

It has been a subject of study that plants may be grown in outer space typically in a weightless but pressurized controlled environment in specific space gardens. In the context of human spaceflight, they can be consumed as food and/or provide a refreshing atmosphere. Plants can metabolize carbon dioxide in the air to produce valuable oxygen, and can help control cabin humidity. Growing plants in space may provide a psychological benefit to human spaceflight crews.

The first challenge in growing plants in space is how to get plants to grow without gravity. This runs into difficulties regarding the effects of gravity on root development, providing appropriate types of lighting, and other challenges. In particular, the nutrient supply to root as well as the nutrient biogeochemical cycles, and the microbiological interactions in soil-based substrates are particularly complex, but have been shown to make possible space farming in hypo- and micro-gravity.

NASA plans to grow plants in space to help feed astronauts, and to provide psychological benefits for long-term space flight.

== Extraterrestrial vegetation ==
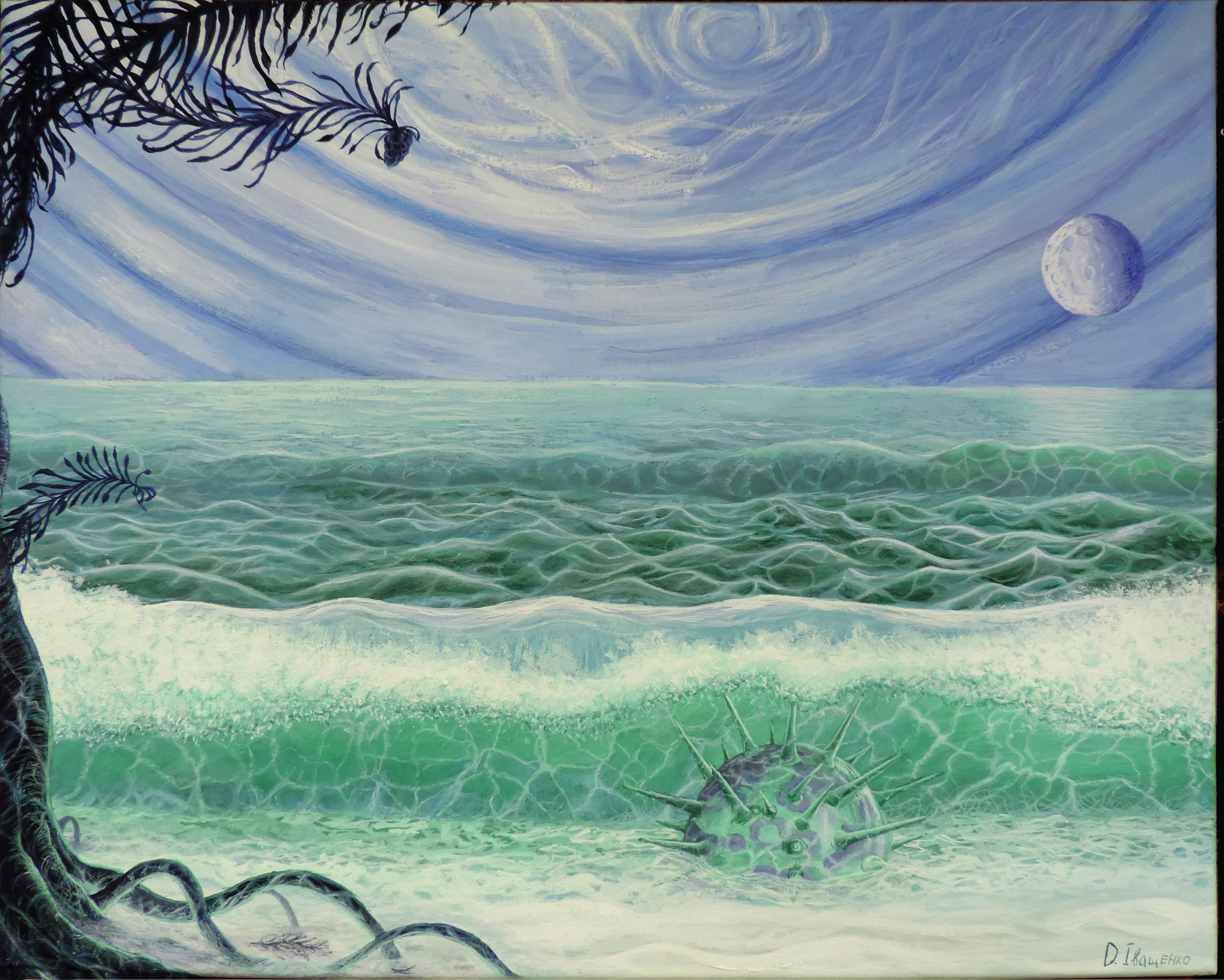
Astrobotany has been the investigation of the idea that alien plant life may exist on other planets. Here an artist has envisioned alien vegetation in beach wrack of an exomoon's sea.

=== Vegetation red edge ===
The vegetation red edge (VRE) is a biosignature of near-infrared wavelengths that is observable through telescopic observation of Earth, and has increased in strength as evolution has made vegetative life more complex. On Earth, this phenomenon has been detected through analysis of planetshine on the Moon, which can show a reflection spectrum that spikes at 700 nm. In an article published in Nature in 1990, Sagan et al. described Galileo's detection of infrared light radiating from Earth as evidence of "widespread biological activity" on earth, with evidence of photosynthesis a particularly strong factor.

The increase-in-strength of Earth's VRE biosignature has been assessed through modelling of early Earth radiation. Mosses and ferns, which were dominant on Earth in the Ordovician and Carboniferous periods, produce weaker detectable infrared radiation spikes at 700 nm than modern Earth vegetation. Astrobotanists focused on extraterrestrial vegetation have thus theorized that by using these same models, it could be possible to measure whether exoplanets in their respective Goldilocks zones currently hold vegetation, and by comparing VRE biosignatures to modelled historic Earth radiation, estimate the complexity of this vegetation.

There are a number of obstacles to the detection of exoplanetary VREs:

- Galileo's detection of Earth's VRE was facilitated by the satellite's physical proximity to Earth; up until the launch of the James Webb Space Telescope in December 2021, telescopic technology was not yet advanced enough to detect the telltale infrared radiation spikes of VRE in distant exoplanet systems.
- Heavy cloud cover has been observed to be detrimental to the detection of VRE, as more cloud cover increases overall albedo, which makes it more difficult to detect radiation wavelength variety. In addition, clouds are detrimental to surface observation, leading to an estimation of ≥20% vegetation cover AND cloud-free surface present as the minimum for detectable exoplanetary VRE visible from telescopes on Earth.
- Certain minerals have been shown to demonstrate similar sharp edge reflective spectra as light-harvesting photosynthetic pigments. This means that mineral origins for VRE-like effects must first be ruled-out before a biological explanation can be confirmed. This may be difficult to achieve from Earth as minerals in finer regolith particle form demonstrate different reflective characteristics than large crystal forms found on Earth. One suggestion made by Sara Seager et al. is to use atmospheric measurements to determine the level of atmospheric oxygen, which if high would rule out surface abundance of non-oxidised minerals.

=== Vegetation searches ===
Dubbed ‘the creator of astrobotany’, Gavriil Adrianovich Tikhov coined the term in 1945 to describe the emerging field surrounding the search for extraterrestrial vegetation. Owing to storms on Mars that cause surface darkening visible from Earth, Tikhov's contemporaries often believed in the existence of Martian vegetation comparable to Earth's seasonal vegetation color changes. Building off of conclusions reached through examining earthshine on the Moon in 1914, in 1918 and 1921 Tikhov discovered through using telescopic color filters that chlorophylls were undetectable on the Martian surface, leading him to hypothesize that the character of Martian vegetation was likely to be blue hued, composed mostly of mosses and lichens. Tikhov's research into astrobotany would later develop into research into growing plants in space, or demonstrating the possibility of plants to grow in extraterrestrial conditions (especially comparing the climate of Mars and Siberia), but he was the first known astronomer to use color to attempt to measure the level of vegetation on an extraterrestrial satellite.

After Galileo's 1990 fly-by demonstrating the VRE effect on Earth, astrobotanical interest in extraterrestrial vegetation has mainly focused on examining the feasibility of VRE detection, and a number of projects have been proposed:

- Both the European Space Agency Darwin project and NASA Terrestrial Planet Finder were cited as projects that could have analyzed exoplanetary VRE biosignatures before being cancelled in 2007 and 2011, respectively.
- The ESO Extremely Large Telescope, set to launch in 2028, has also been cited as another telescope that will be able to detect exoplanetary VRE biosignatures.
- Future NASA space telescopes, such as the Habitable Exoplanet Imaging Mission, have been planned with the capacity to examine for VRE biosignatures.

The James Webb Space Telescope has been searching the TRAPPIST-1 exoplanet system since 2021 for signs of extraterrestrial vegetation through capturing atmospheric data, including a VRE biosignature, that is made visible when TRAPPIST-1's exoplanets pass across the face of the star. NASA have judged three of TRAPPIST-1's rocky exoplanets (1e, 1f, and 1g) as within the habitable zone for liquid water (and other biological matter, such as vegetation).

=== Character of extraterrestrial vegetation ===
Accurate description of extraterrestrial vegetation character is highly speculative, but follows "solid physics and atmospheric chemistry" principles, according to Professor John Albert Raven from the University of Dundee.

One factor determining the character of extraterrestrial vegetation is the star at the centre of the system. The Sun is a G-type main-sequence star, which provides the conditions for chlorophyll photosynthesis, and radiation levels that govern atmospheric conditions such as wind, affecting evolutionary development. TRAPPIST-1 is an ultra-cool red dwarf star, providing almost half the energy as the Sun, leading to astrobotanical speculation that vegetation in the TRAPPIST-1 exoplanet system could be much darker, even black to human eyes.

F-type main-sequence stars, on the other hand, such as sigma Boötis, have been speculated to encourage the growth of either yellow-tinted, or blue-tinted extraterrestrial vegetation within its exoplanet system, in order to reflect back the high levels of blue photons emitted by stars of its type.

== Growing plants in space ==
The study of plant response in space environments is another subject of astrobotany research. In space, plants encounter unique environmental stressors not found on Earth including microgravity, ionizing radiation, and oxidative stress. Experiments have shown that these stressors cause genetic alterations in plant metabolism pathways. Changes in genetic expression have shown that plants respond on a molecular level to a space environment. Astrobotanical research has been applied to the challenges of creating life support systems both in space and on other planets, primarily Mars.

== History ==
Russian scientist Konstantin Tsiolkovsky was one of the first people to discuss using photosynthetic life as a resource in space agricultural systems. Speculation about plant cultivation in space has been around since the early 20th century. The term astrobotany was first used in 1945 by Soviet astronomer and astrobiology pioneer Gavriil Adrianovich Tikhov. Tikhov is considered to be the father of astrobotany. Research in the field has been conducted both with growing Earth plants in space environments and searching for botanical life on other planets.

=== Seeds ===
The first organisms in space were "specially developed strains of seeds" launched to 134 km (83 mi) on 9 July 1946 on a U.S. launched V-2 rocket. These samples were not recovered. The first seeds launched into space and successfully recovered were maize seeds launched on 30 July 1946, which were soon followed by rye and cotton. These early suborbital biological experiments were handled by Harvard University and the Naval Research Laboratory and were concerned with radiation exposure on living tissue. In 1971, 500 tree seeds (loblolly pine, sycamore, sweetgum, redwood, and Douglas fir) were flown around the Moon on Apollo 14. These Moon trees were planted and grown with controls back on Earth where no changes were detected.

=== Plants ===
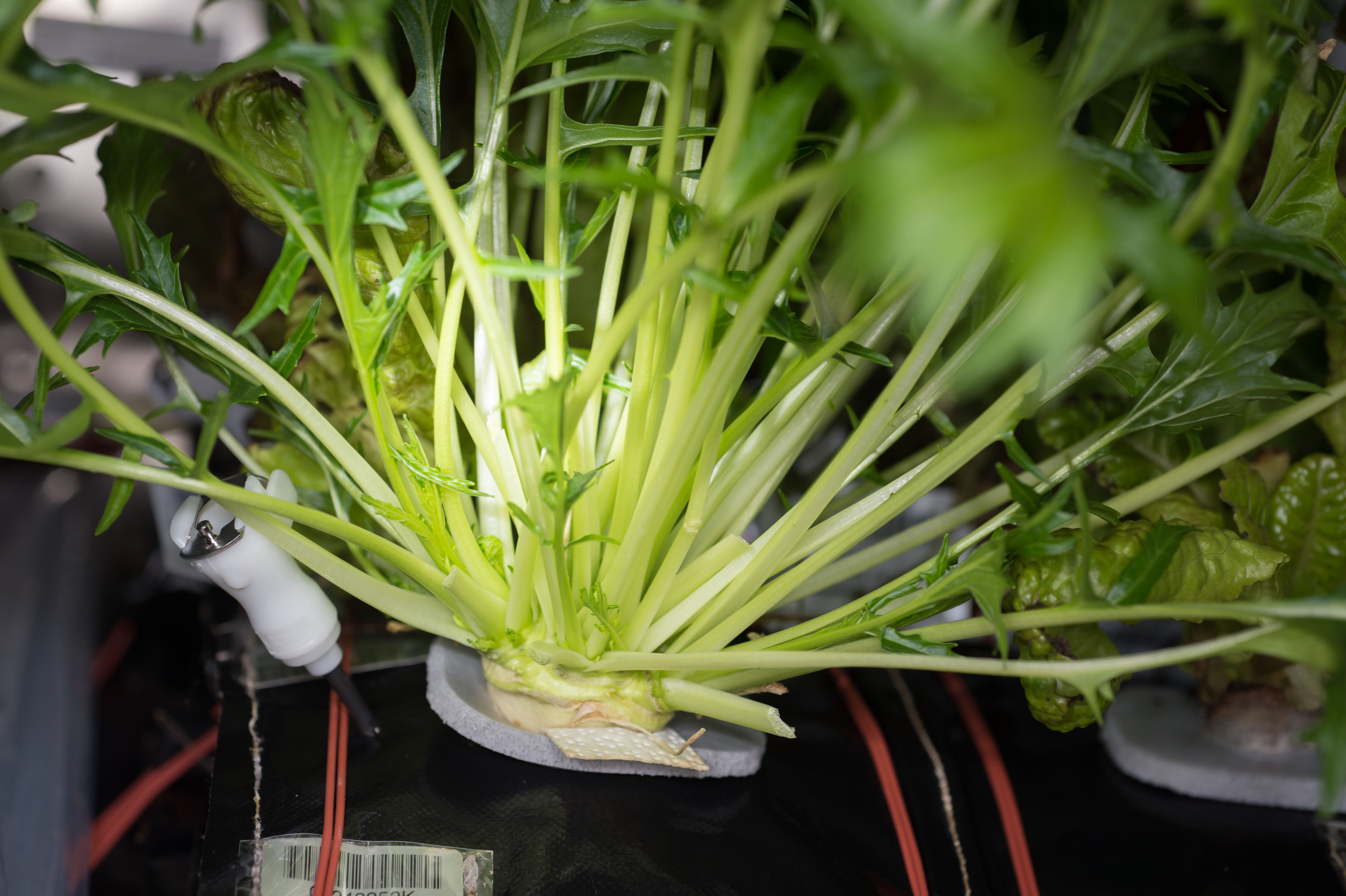
The arugula-like lettuce Mizuna growing for Veg-03

In 1982, the crew of the Soviet Salyut 7 space station conducted an experiment, prepared by Lithuanian scientists (Alfonsas Merkys and others), and grew some Arabidopsis using Fiton-3 experimental micro-greenhouse apparatus, thus becoming the first plants to flower and produce seeds in space. A Skylab experiment studied the effects of gravity and light on rice plants. The SVET-2 Space Greenhouse successfully achieved seed to seed plant growth in 1997 aboard space station Mir. Bion 5 carried Daucus carota and Bion 7 carried maize (aka corn).

Plant research continued on the International Space Station. Biomass Production System was used on the ISS Expedition 4. The Vegetable Production System (Veggie) system was later used aboard ISS. Plants tested in Veggie before going into space included lettuce, Swiss chard, radishes, Chinese cabbage and peas. Red Romaine lettuce was grown in space on Expedition 40 which were harvested when mature, frozen and tested back on Earth. Expedition 44 members became the first American astronauts to eat plants grown in space on 10 August 2015, when their crop of Red Romaine was harvested. Since 2003 Russian cosmonauts have been eating half of their crop while the other half goes towards further research. In 2012, a sunflower bloomed aboard the ISS under the care of NASA astronaut Donald Pettit. In January 2016, US astronauts announced that a zinnia had blossomed aboard the ISS.

in 2018 the Veggie-3 experiment was tested with plant pillows and root mats. One of the goals is to grow food for crew consumption. Crops tested at this time include cabbage, lettuce, and mizuna.

=== Known terrestrial plants grown in space ===
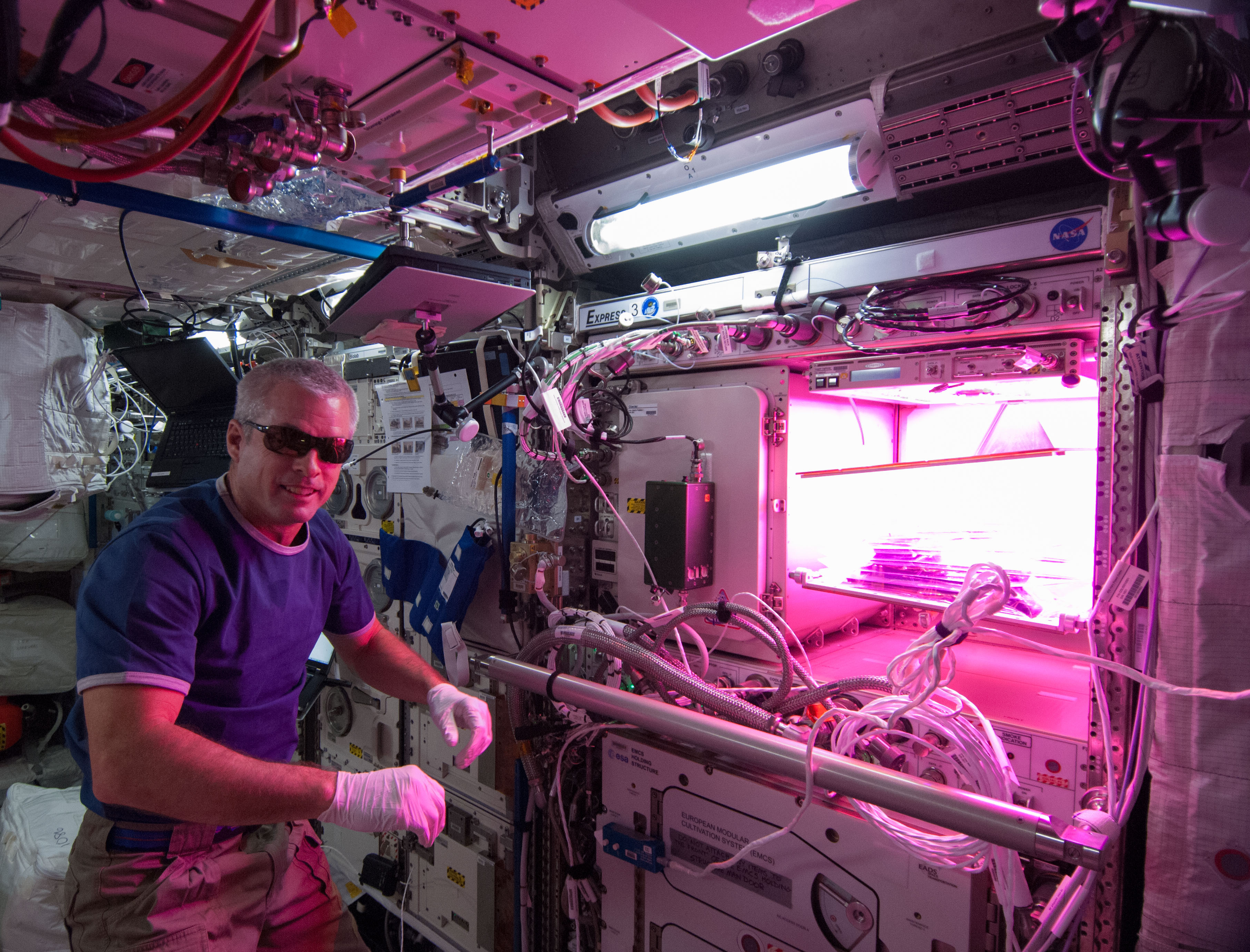
'Outredgeous' red lettuce cultivar grown aboard the International Space Station

Plants that have been grown in space include:

- Arabidopsis (Thale cress)
- Bok choy (Tokyo Bekana) (Chinese cabbage)
- Tulips
- Kalanchoe
- Flax
- Onions, peas, radishes, lettuce, wheat, garlic, cucumbers, parsley, potato, and dill
- Cinnamon basil
- Cabbage
- Zinnia hybrida ('Profusion' var.)
- Red romaine lettuce ('Outredgeous' var.)
- Sunflower
- Ceratopteris richardii
- Brachypodium distachyon

Some plants, like tobacco and morning glory, have not been directly grown in space but have been subjected to space environments and then germinated and grown on Earth.

=== Plants for life support in space ===
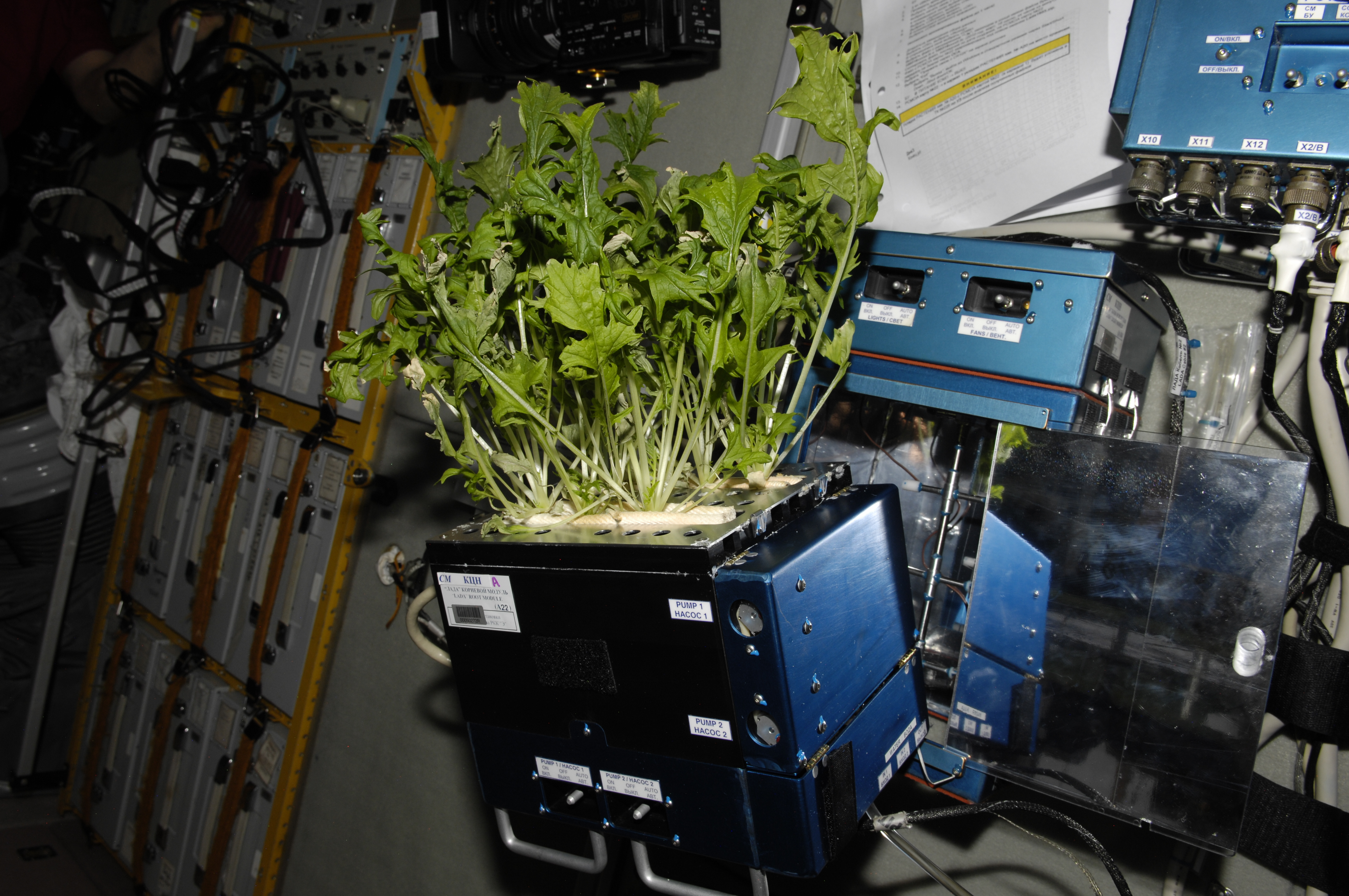
Lettuce being grown and harvested in the International Space Station before being frozen and returned to Earth

Algae was the first candidate for human-plant life support systems. Initial research in the 1950s and 1960s used Chlorella, Anacystis, Synechocystis, Scenedesmus, Synechococcus, and Spirulina species to study how photosynthetic organisms could be used for O_{2} and CO_{2} cycling in closed systems. Later research through Russia's BIOS program and the US's CELSS program investigated the use of higher plants to fulfill the roles of atmospheric regulators, waste recyclers, and food for sustained missions. The crops most commonly studied include starch crops such as wheat, potato, and rice; protein-rich crops such as soy, peanut, and common bean; and a host of other nutrition-enhancing crops like lettuce, strawberry, and kale. Tests for optimal growth conditions in closed systems have required research both into environmental parameters necessary for particular crops (such as differing light periods for short-day versus long-day crops) and cultivars that are a best-fit for life support system growth.

Tests of human-plant life support systems in space are relatively few compared to similar testing performed on Earth and micro-gravity testing on plant growth in space. The first life support systems testing performed in space included gas exchange experiments with wheat, potato, and giant duckweed (Spyrodela polyrhiza). Smaller scale projects, sometimes referred to as "salad machines", have been used to provide fresh produce to astronauts as a dietary supplement. Future studies have been planned to investigate the effects of keeping plants on the mental well-being of humans in confined environments.

More recent research has been focused on extrapolating these life support systems to other planets, primarily Martian bases. Interlocking closed systems called "modular biospheres" have been prototyped to support four- to five-person crews on the Martian surface. These encampments are designed as inflatable greenhouses and bases. They are anticipated to use Martian soils for growth substrate and wastewater treatment, and crop cultivars developed specifically for extraplanetary life. There has also been discussion of using the Martian moon Phobos as a resources base, potentially mining frozen water and carbon dioxide from the surface and eventually using hollowed craters for autonomous growth chambers that can be harvested during mining missions.

== Plant research ==
The study of plant research has yielded information useful to other areas of botany and horticulture. Extensive research into hydroponics systems was fielded successfully by NASA in both the CELSS and ALS programs, as well as the effects of increased photoperiod and light intensity for various crop species. Research also led to optimization of yields beyond what had been previously achieved by indoor cropping systems. Intensive studying of gas exchange and plant volatile concentrations in closed systems led to increased understanding of plant response to extreme levels of gases such as carbon dioxide and ethylene. Usage of LEDs in closed life support systems research also prompted the increased use of LEDs in indoor growing operations.

== Experiments ==
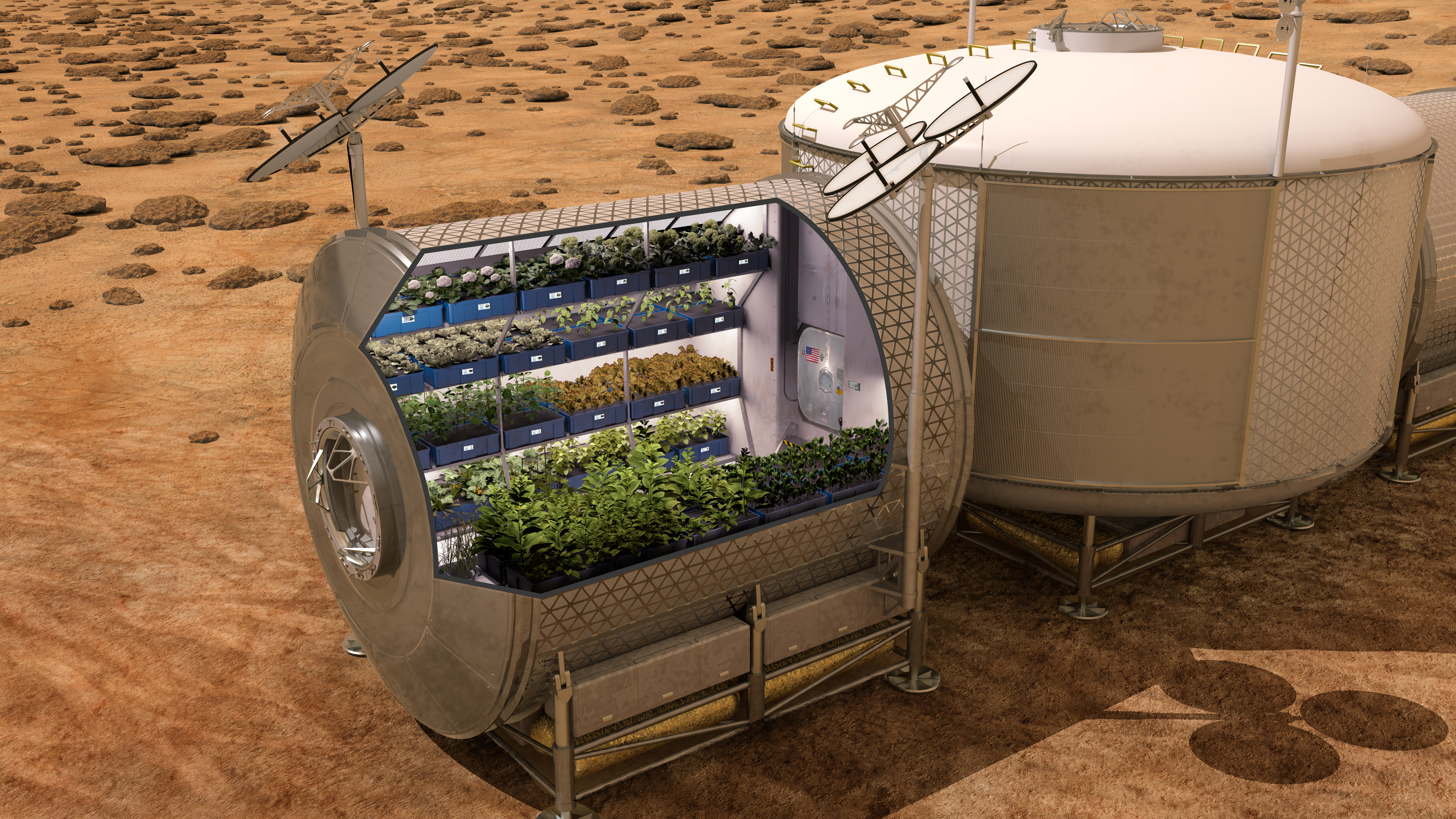
Illustration of plants growing in a hypothetical Mars base

Some experiments to do with plants include:

- Bion satellites
- Biomass Production System, aboard ISS
- Vegetable Production System (Veggie), aboard ISS.
- SVET
- SVET-2, aboard Mir.
- ADVASC
- TAGES, aboard ISS.
- Plant Growth/Plant Phototropism, aboard Skylab
- Oasis plant growth unit
- Plant Signaling (STS-135)
- Plant growth experiment (STS-95)
- NASA Clean Air Study
- ECOSTRESS, 2018

== Results of experiments ==
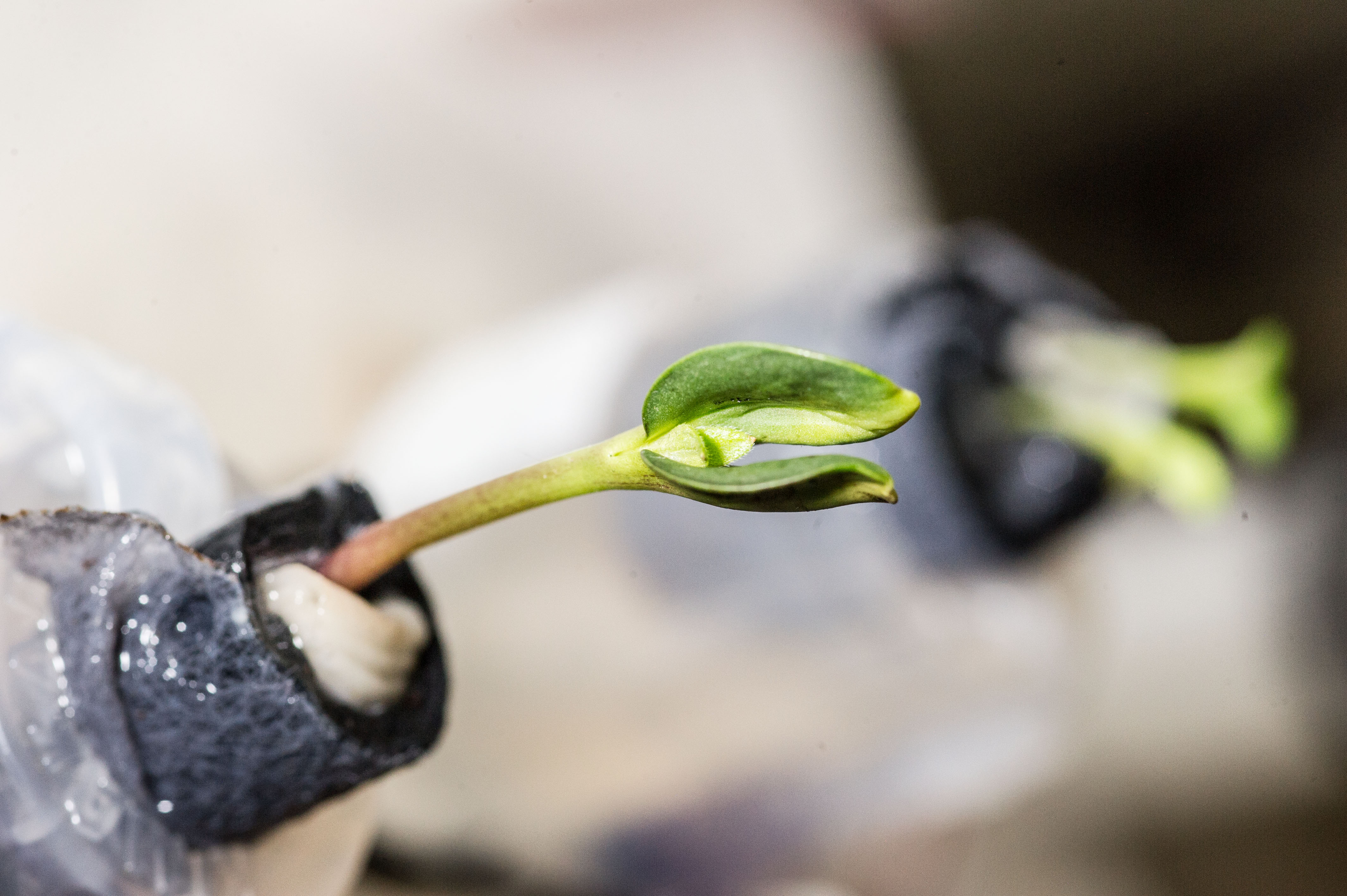
A young sunflower plant aboard the ISS

Several experiments have been focused on how plant growth and distribution compares in micro-gravity, space conditions versus Earth conditions. This enables scientists to explore whether certain plant growth patterns are innate or environmentally driven. For instance, Allan H. Brown tested seedling movements aboard the Space Shuttle Columbia in 1983. Sunflower seedling movements were recorded while in orbit. They observed that the seedlings still experienced rotational growth and circumnation despite lack of gravity, showing these behaviors are built-in.

Other experiments have found that plants have the ability to exhibit gravitropism, even in low-gravity conditions. For instance, the ESA's European Modular Cultivation System enables experimentation with plant growth; acting as a miniature greenhouse, scientists aboard the International Space Station can investigate how plants react in variable-gravity conditions. The Gravi-1 experiment (2008) utilized the EMCS to study lentil seedling growth and amyloplast movement on the calcium-dependent pathways. The results of this experiment found that the plants were able to sense the direction of gravity even at very low levels. A later experiment with the EMCS placed 768 lentil seedlings in a centrifuge to stimulate various gravitational changes; this experiment, Gravi-2 (2014), displayed that plants change calcium signalling towards root growth while being grown in several gravity levels.

Many experiments have a more generalized approach in observing overall plant growth patterns as opposed to one specific growth behavior. One such experiment from the Canadian Space Agency, for example, found that white spruce seedlings grew differently in the anti-gravity space environment compared with Earth-bound seedlings; the space seedlings exhibited enhanced growth from the shoots and needles, and also had randomized amyloplast distribution compared with the Earth-bound control group.

== In popular culture ==
Astrobotany has had several acknowledgements in science fiction literature and film.

- In the 1972 film Silent Running it is implied that, in the future, all plant life on Earth has become extinct. As many specimens as possible have been preserved in a series of enormous, greenhouse-like geodesic domes, attached to a large spaceship named Valley Forge, forming part of a fleet of American Airlines space freighters, currently just outside the orbit of Saturn.
- Charles Sheffield's 1989 novel Proteus Unbound mentions the use of algae suspended in a giant hollow "planet" as a biofuel, creating a closed energy system.
- The 2009 film Avatar features an exobiologist, Dr. Grace Augustine, who wrote the first astrobotanical text on the flora of Pandora.
- The 2011 book and 2015 film The Martian by Andy Weir highlights the heroic survival of botanist Mark Watney, who uses his horticultural background to grow potatoes for food while trapped on Mars.
- In the 2023 American animated series Scavengers Reign, about humans stranded on another planet, the very diverse and inventive local flora play an important part.

== See also ==
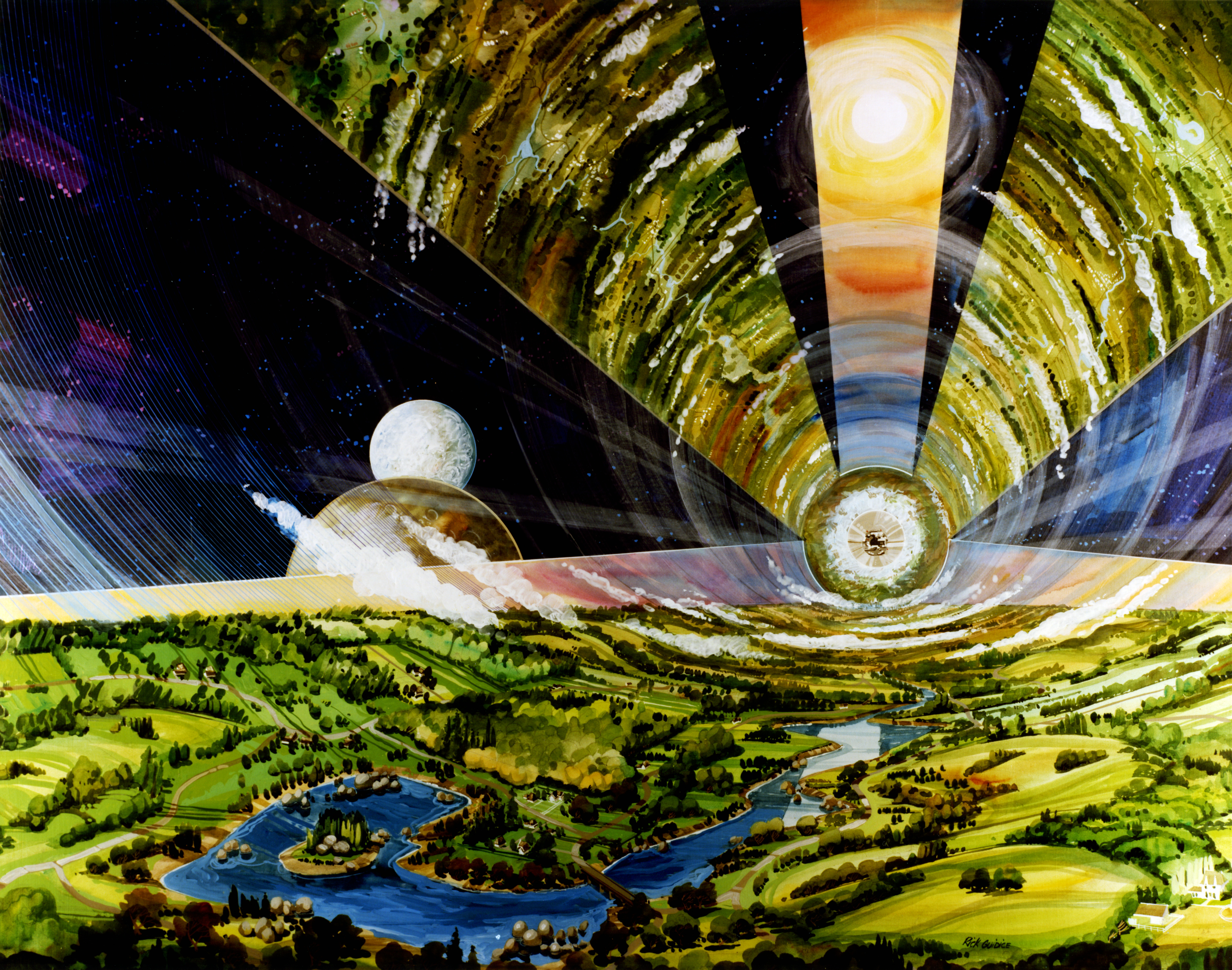
Interior view the hypothetical O'Neill cylinder space habitat, showing alternating land and window stripes

- Bioastronautics – Academic discipline
- Biolab – Science payload fitted inside the Columbus laboratory of the ISS
- Bion (satellite) – Soviet and Russian spacecraft aimed at biological experiments in space
- BIOPAN – European Space Agency research program
- Biosatellite program – Series of 3 NASA satellites to assess the effects of spaceflight on living organisms
- Endolith – Organism living inside a rock
- EXPOSE – External facility on the ISS dedicated to astrobiology experiments
- List of microorganisms tested in outer space
- Moon tree – Tree grown from seed carried on Apollo 14 or Artemis I
- O/OREOS – NASA nanosatellite with 2 astrobiology experiments on board
- Space farming
- Space food – Food consumed by astronauts in outer space
- Terraforming – Hypothetical planetary engineering process
