= Veggie (disambiguation) =

A veggie, or vegetable, is a part of a plant consumed as food.

Veggie may also refer to:

- Vegetarians
- Veggies of Nottingham, a catering company based in Nottingham, UK
- Vegetable Production System, or Veggie, used on the International Space Station
- Veggies, the characters in VeggieTales, an American series of children's films

== See also ==
- Casey Veggies (born 1993), American hip-hop recording artist
- Vegetable (disambiguation)
