= Plants in space =

Growth of plants in outer space

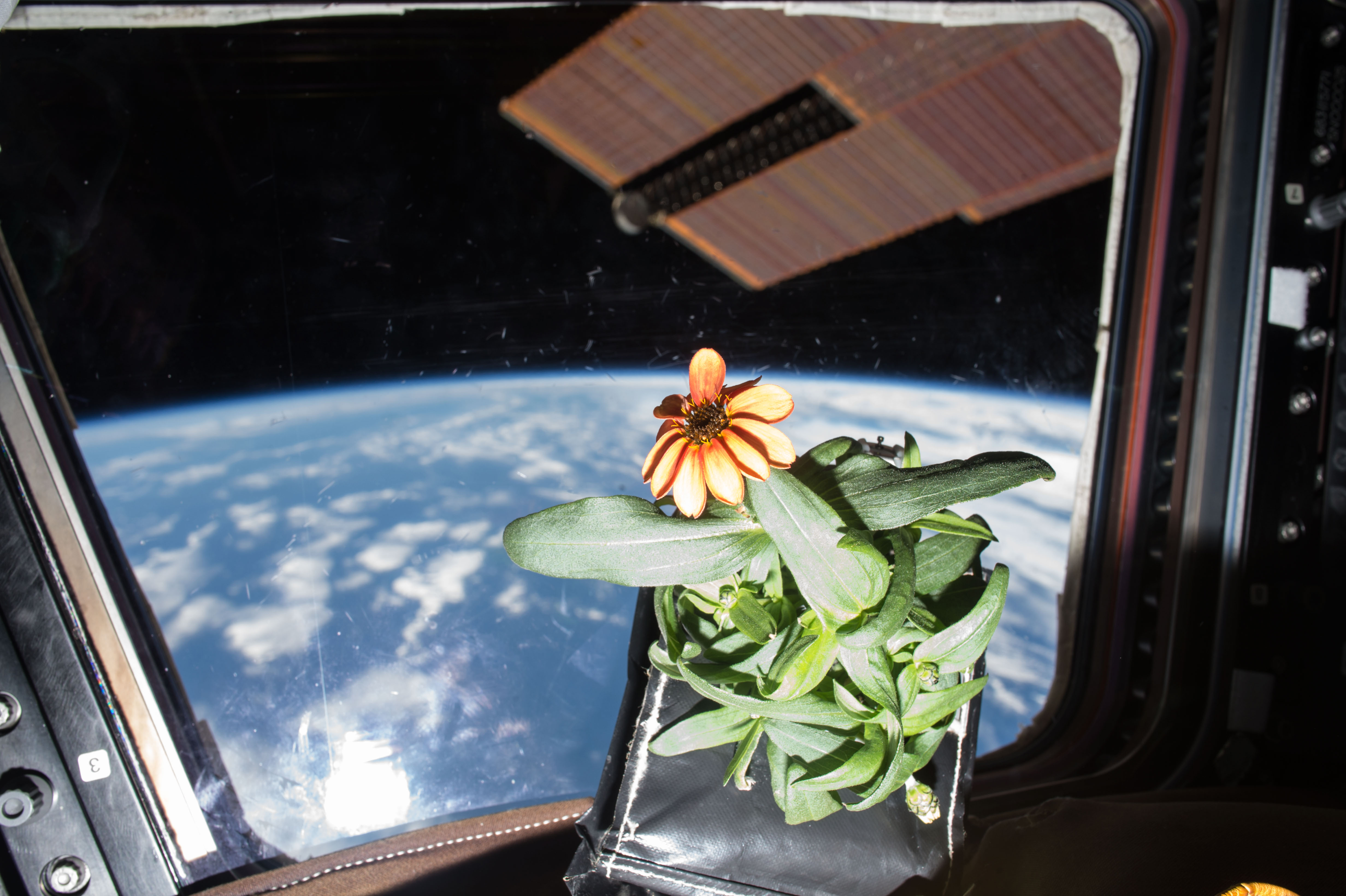
Zinnia plant in bloom aboard an Earth orbiting space station

The growth of plants in outer space has elicited much scientific interest moving from fictional discussion such as the trees on the brick moon space station in the 1869 short story "The Brick Moon". In the late 20th and early 21st century, plants were often taken into space in low Earth orbit to be grown in a weightless but pressurized controlled environment, sometimes called space gardens. In the context of human spaceflight, they can be consumed as food and provide a refreshing atmosphere. Plants can metabolize carbon dioxide in the air to produce valuable oxygen, and can help control cabin humidity. Growing plants in space may provide a psychological benefit to human spaceflight crews. Usually the plants were part of studies or technical development to further develop space gardens or conduct science experiments. To date plants taken into space have had mostly scientific interest, with only limited contributions to the functionality of the spacecraft. The 1971 Apollo Moon tree project was a more or less forestry inspired mission and the trees were part of the USA's bicentennial celebration in 1976.

The first challenge in growing plants in space is the absence of gravity, which is important for root development, soil integration, and watering. Other problems include providing appropriate lighting. For longer-term growth, inorganic nutrient supply to the roots as well as biogeochemical cycles, and the microbiological interactions in soil-based substrates are particularly complex. However, modelling and experimentation have indicated that space farming should be possible in hypo- and micro-gravity.

NASA has tested growing plants in space to help feed astronauts and to provide psychological benefits for long-term space flight. In 2017, Chinese cabbage (Brassica rapa) grown in the International Space Station was eaten by the crew, as well as saving some for study after return to Earth.

== History ==
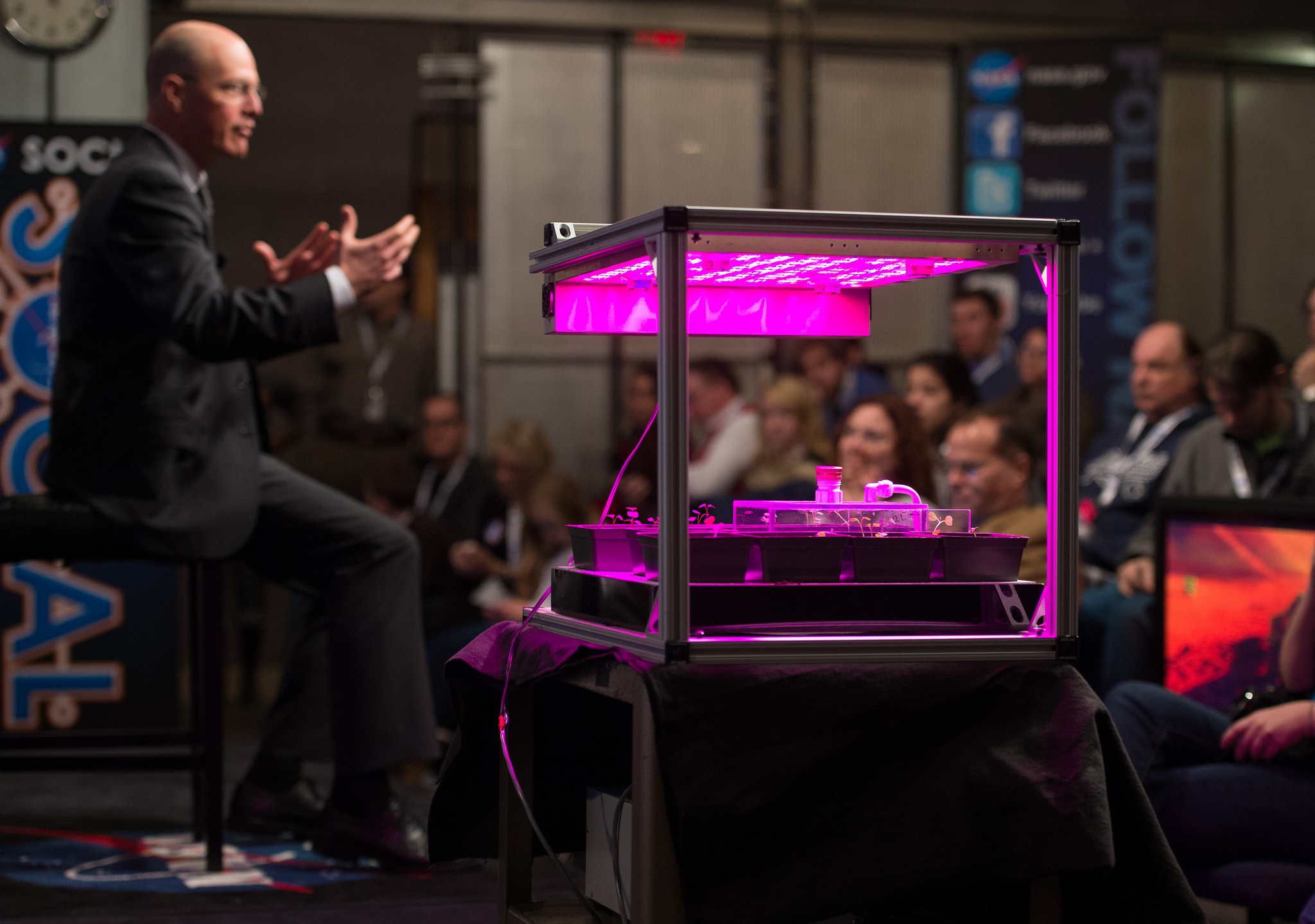
Vegetable Production System for ISS being discussed

In the 2010s there was an increased desire for long-term space missions, which led to desire for space-based plant production as food for astronauts. An example of this is vegetable production on the International Space Station in Earth orbit. By the year 2010, 20 plant growth experiments had been conducted aboard the International Space Station.

Several experiments have been focused on how plant growth and distribution compares in micro-gravity, space conditions versus Earth conditions. This enables scientists to explore whether certain plant growth patterns are innate or environmentally driven. For instance, Allan H. Brown tested seedling movements aboard the Space Shuttle Columbia in 1983. Sunflower seedling movements were recorded while in orbit. They observed that the seedlings still experienced rotational growth and circumnutation despite lack of gravity, showing these behaviors are instinctual.

Other experiments have found that plants have the ability to exhibit gravitropism, even in low-gravity conditions. For instance, the ESA's European Modular Cultivation System enables experimentation with plant growth; acting as a miniature greenhouse, scientists aboard the International Space Station can investigate how plants react in variable-gravity conditions. The Gravi-1 experiment (2008) utilized the EMCS to study lentil seedling growth and amyloplast movement on the calcium-dependent pathways. The results of this experiment found that the plants were able to sense the direction of gravity even at very low levels. A later experiment with the EMCS placed 768 lentil seedlings in a centrifuge to stimulate various gravitational changes; this experiment, Gravi-2 (2014), displayed that plants change calcium signalling towards root growth while being grown in several gravity levels.

Many experiments have a more generalized approach in observing overall plant growth patterns as opposed to one specific growth behavior. One such experiment from the Canadian Space Agency, for example, found that white spruce seedlings grew differently in the anti-gravity space environment compared with Earth-bound seedlings; the space seedlings exhibited enhanced growth from the shoots and needles, and also had randomized amyloplast distribution compared with the Earth-bound control group.

Food production is key to making Space exploration feasible. Currently, the cost of sending food to the International Space Station (ISS) is estimated as USD$20 000–40 000/kg, with each crew member receiving ~1.8 kg of food (plus packaging) per day . Re-stocking from Earth, a lunar orbiting Space station or Mars habitation with food will be significantly more costly. The first trips to Mars are expected to be a three-year round trip, and it has been estimated that a four-person crew would need 10–11 000 kgs of food.

=== Early efforts ===
The first organisms in space were "specially developed strains of seeds" launched to 134 km (83 mi) on 9 July 1946 on a U.S. launched V-2 rocket. These samples were not recovered. The first seeds launched into space and successfully recovered were maize seeds launched on 30 July 1946. Soon followed rye and cotton. These early suborbital biological experiments were handled by Harvard University and the Naval Research Laboratory and were concerned with radiation exposure on living tissue. On September 22 1966, Kosmos 110 launched with two dogs and moisturized seeds. Several of those seeds germinated, the first to do so, resulting in lettuce, cabbage and some beans that had greater yield than their controls on Earth. In 1971, 500 tree seeds (loblolly pine, sycamore, sweetgum, redwood, and Douglas fir) were flown around the Moon on Apollo 14. These Moon trees were planted and grown with controls back on Earth where no changes were detected.

=== Space station era ===
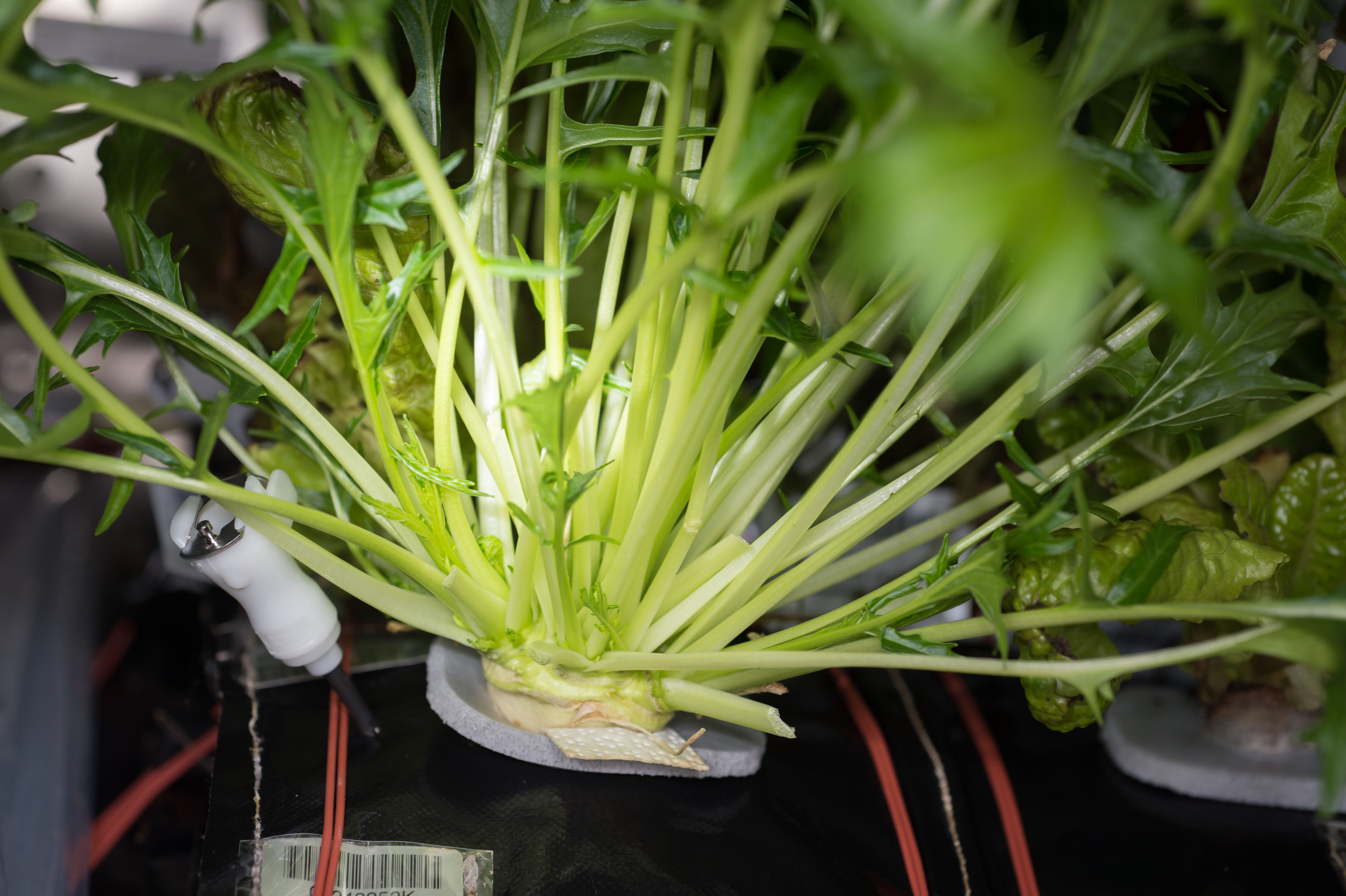
The arugula-like lettuce Mizuna growing for Veg-03

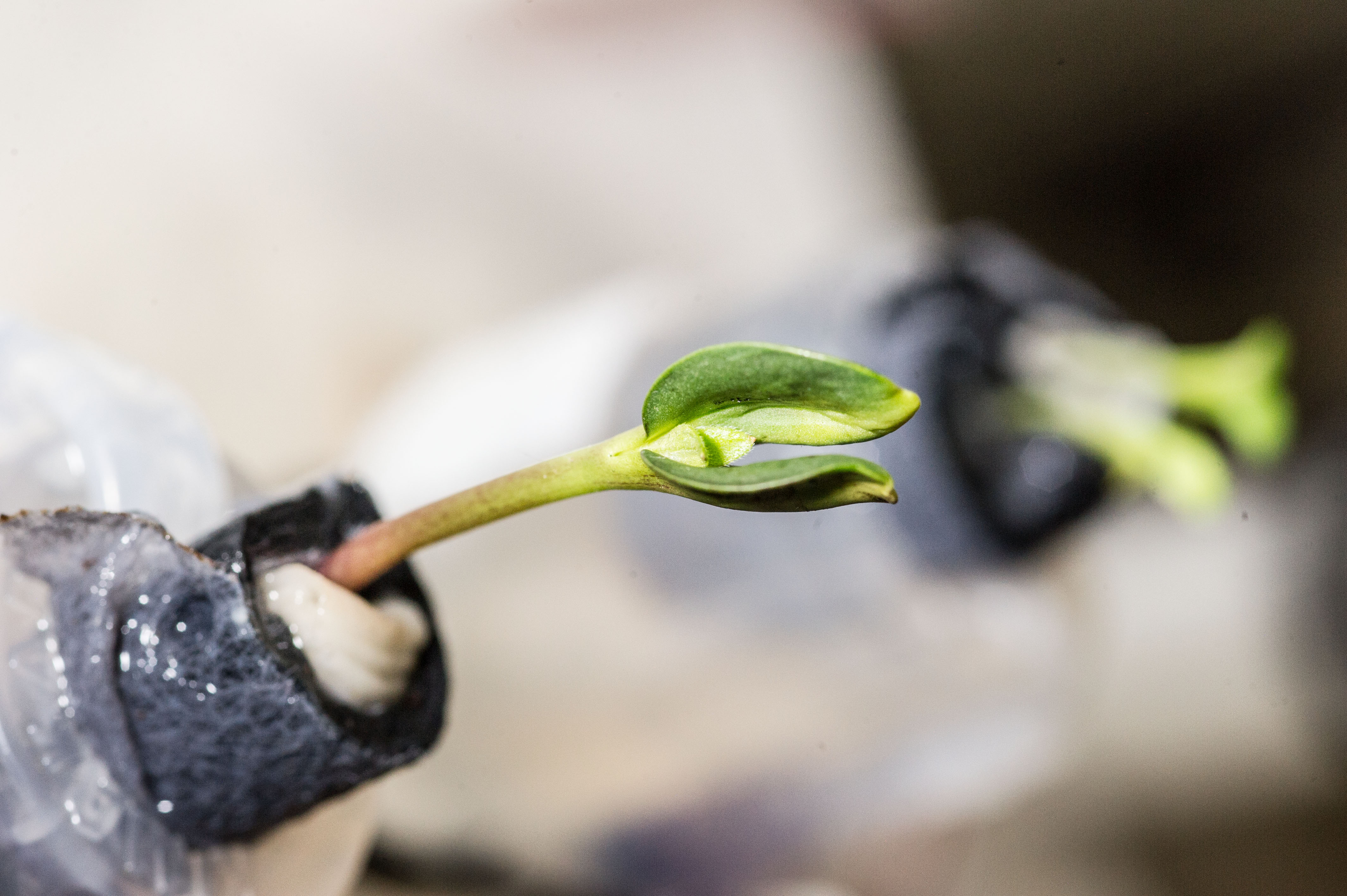
A young sunflower plant aboard the ISS

In 1982, the crew of the Soviet Salyut 7 space station conducted an experiment, prepared by Lithuanian scientists (Alfonsas Merkys and others), and grew some Arabidopsis using Fiton-3 experimental micro-greenhouse apparatus, thus becoming the first plants to flower and produce seeds in space. A Skylab experiment studied the effects of gravity and light on rice plants. The SVET-2 Space Greenhouse successfully achieved seed to seed plant growth in 1997 aboard space station Mir. Bion 5 carried Daucus carota and Bion 7 carried maize (aka corn).

Plant research continued on the International Space Station. Biomass Production System was used on the ISS Expedition 4. The Vegetable Production System (Veggie) system was later used aboard ISS. Plants tested in Veggie before going into space included lettuce, Swiss chard, radishes, Chinese cabbage and peas. Red Romaine lettuce was grown in space on Expedition 40 which were harvested when mature, frozen and tested back on Earth. Expedition 44 members became the first American astronauts to eat plants grown in space on 10 August 2015, when their crop of Red Romaine was harvested. Since 2003 Russian cosmonauts have been eating half of their crop while the other half goes towards further research. In 2012, a sunflower bloomed aboard the ISS under the care of NASA astronaut Donald Pettit. In January 2016, US astronauts announced that a zinnia had blossomed aboard the ISS.

In 2017 the Advanced Plant Habitat was designed for ISS, which was a nearly self-sustaining plant growth system for that space station in low Earth orbit. The system is installed in parallel with another plant grown system aboard the station, VEGGIE, and a major difference with that system is that APH is designed to need less upkeep by humans. APH is supported by the Plant Habitat Avionics Real-Time Manager. Some plants that were to be tested in APH include Dwarf Wheat and Arabidopsis. In December 2017 hundreds of seeds were delivered to ISS for growth in the VEGGIE system. APH is an important advancement in the understanding of plant growth in space and therefore the future of space exploration in general.

In 2018 the Veggie-3 experiment at the ISS, was tested with plant pillows and root mats. One of the goals is to grow food for crew consumption. Crops tested at this time include cabbage, lettuce, and mizuna. In 2018, the PONDS system for nutrient deliver in microgravity was tested.

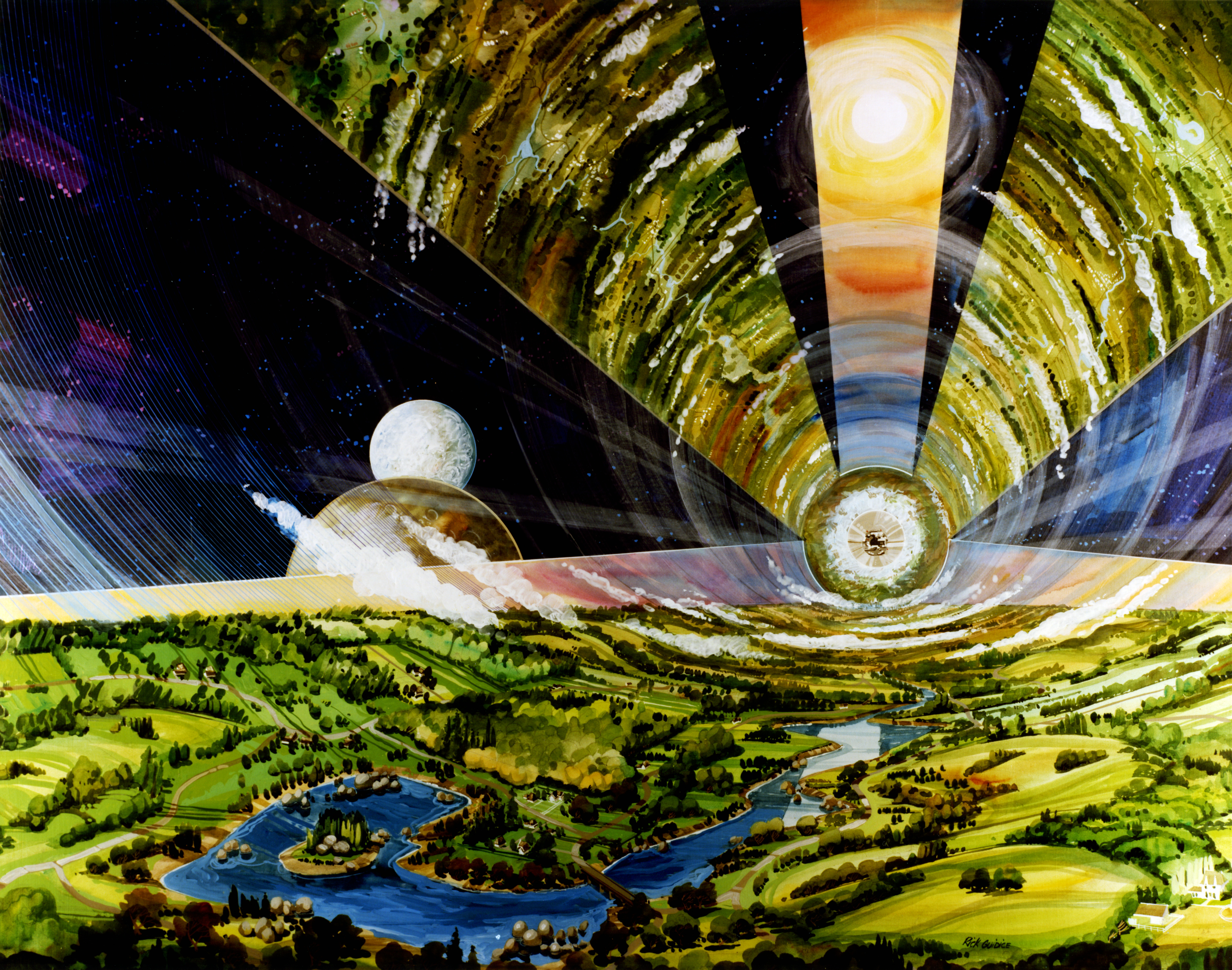
Interior view of a hypothetical O'Neill cylinder space habitat, showing alternating land and window stripes

In December 2018, the German Aerospace Center launched the EuCROPIS satellite into low Earth orbit. This mission carried two greenhouses intended to grow tomatoes under simulated gravity of first the Moon and then Mars (6 months each) using by-products of human presence in space as source of nutrients. When scientists activated the experiment, they found that the greenhouses were functional, but the irrigation system was not; therefore the dormant seeds could not be used.

The Seedling Growth series of experiments to study the mechanisms of tropisms and the cell/cycle were performed on the ISS between 2013 and 2017. These experiments also involved using the model plant Arabidopsis thaliana, and were a collaboration between NASA (John Z. Kiss as PI) and ESA (F. Javier Medina as PI).

On 30 November 2020, astronauts aboard the ISS collected the first harvest of radishes grown on the station. A total of 20 plants was collected and prepared for transportation back to Earth. There are currently plans to repeat the experiment and grow a second batch.

=== Lunar surface ===
==== Lunar soil on the moon ====
Chang'e 4 lunar lander in January 2019, carried a 3 kg (6.6 lb) sealed "biosphere" with many seeds and insect eggs to test whether plants and insects could hatch and grow together in synergy. The experiment included seeds of potatoes, tomatoes, and Arabidopsis thaliana (a flowering plant), as well as silkworm eggs. On January 15, 2019, it was reported that cotton seeds had grown in the biosphere - this became the first plant grown on the Moon. Environmental systems were in place to keep the container hospitable and Earth-like, except for the low lunar gravity. It was hoped that if the eggs hatched, the larvae would produce carbon dioxide, while the germinated plants would release oxygen through photosynthesis. It was hoped that together, the plants and silkworms can establish a simple synergy within the container. A miniature camera was to photograph any growth. The biological experiment was designed by 28 Chinese universities.

In 2023 it was reported that the original 100 day experiment was scaled back to 9 days; the insects did not hatch and the potatoes did not sprout. The cotton survived for 2 days before succumbing to temperature changes.

==== Lunar soil on earth ====
Lunar soil has also been proven to allow plants to grow on, tested in a laboratory at the University of Florida. These experiments showed that while the plant Arabidopsis thaliana can germinate and grow in lunar soil, that there are challenges presented in the plants ability to thrive, as many were slow to develop. Plants that did germinate showed morphological and transcriptomic indications of stress.

== Plants grown in space ==
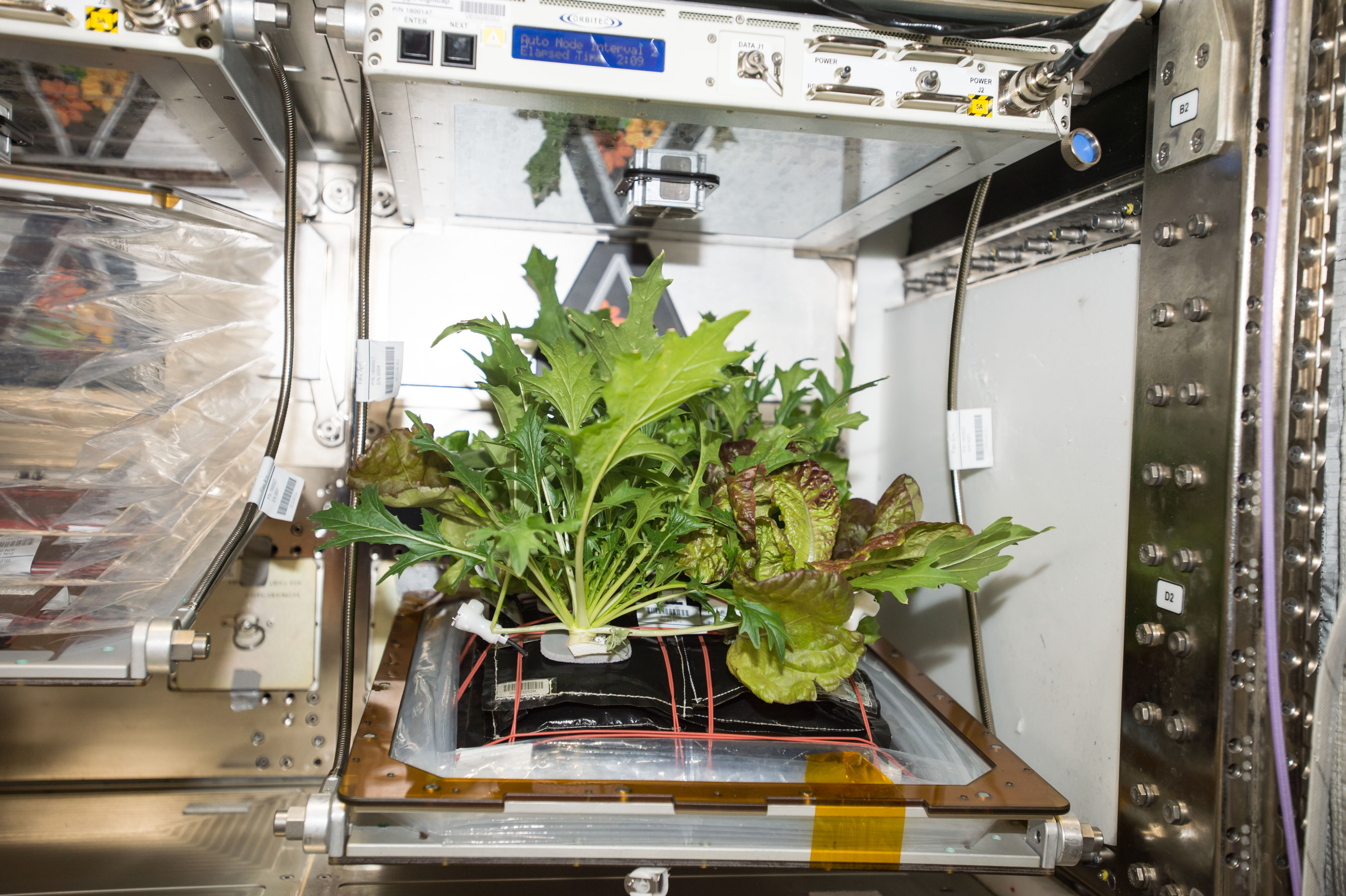
Lettuce grown in space aboard the ISS

Plants grown in space include:

- Arabidopsis (Thale cress)
- Bok choy (Tokyo Bekana) (Chinese cabbage)
- Super dwarf wheat
- Apogey wheat
- Brassica rapa
- Rice
- Tulips
- Kalanchoe
- Flax
- Onions, peas, radishes, lettuce, wheat, garlic, cucumbers, parsley, potato, and dill
- Lettuce and Cinnamon basil
- Cabbage
- Zinnia hybrida ("Profusion" var.)
- Mizuna lettuce
- Red romaine lettuce ("Outredgeous" var.)
- Sunflower
- Ceratopteris richardii

== Experiments ==
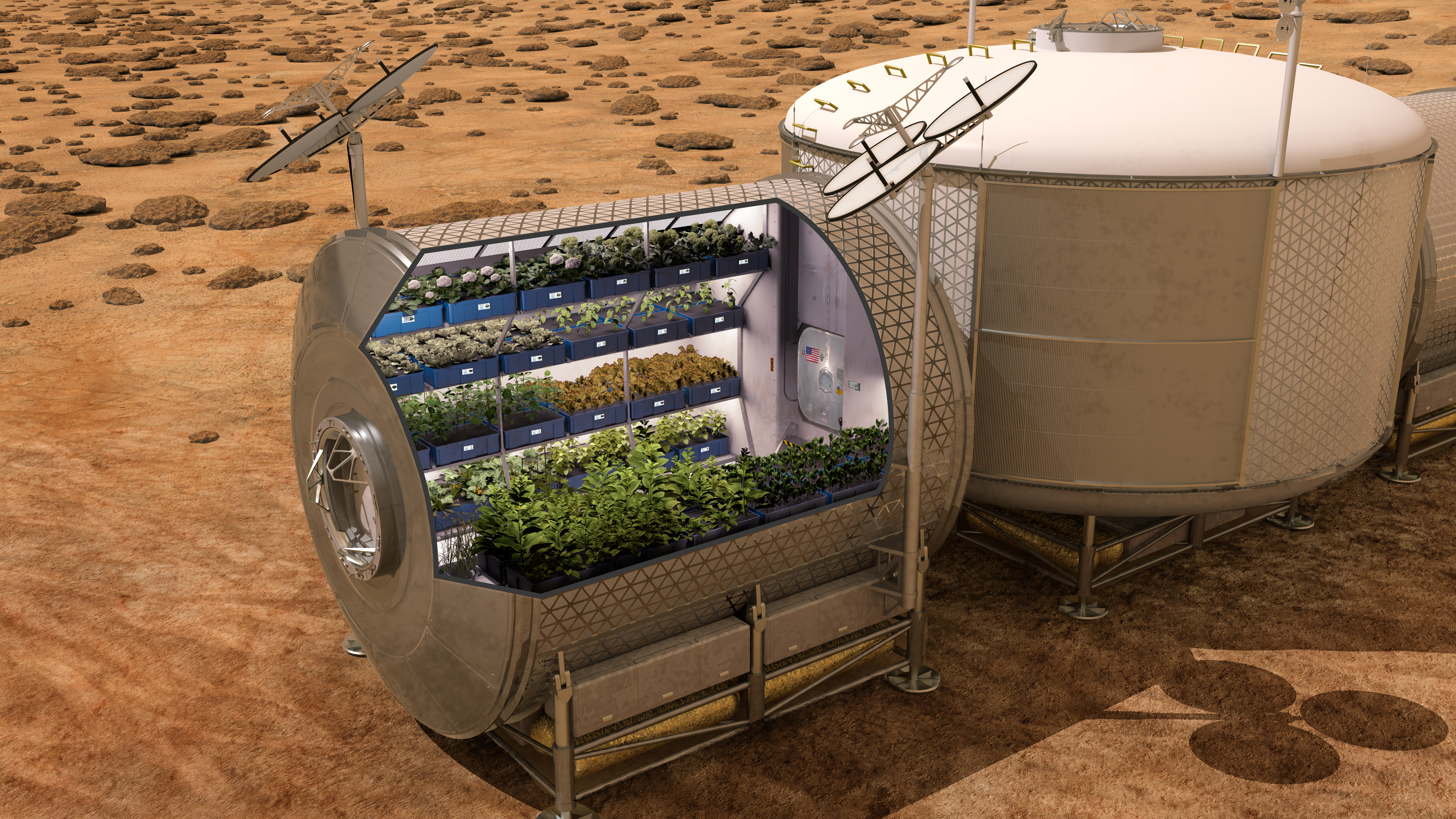
Illustration of plants growing in a hypothetical Mars base

Some experiments involving plants include:

- Oasis plant growth unit, began 1971 aboard the Salyut 1.
- Plant Growth/Plant Phototropism, selected March 1972 aboard Skylab.
- Bion satellites, began 1973.
- NASA Clean Air Study, began in 1989 at the Stennis Space Center.
- SVET/Greenhouse experiments, beginning June 1990 aboard Mir.
- Plant growth experiment (STS-95), began October 1998 aboard the ISS.
- Space Rose (STS-95), to evaluate the effects of microgravity on the production of aroma constituents, a rose plant with both an unopened bud and a half bloom was sent into the space aboard NASA space shuttle STS-95 for 9 days, from October 29 through November 6, 1998.
- Biomass Production System, began April 2002, aboard the ISS.
- Lada greenhouse (aka Lada Validating Vegetable Production Unit), began 2002, aboard the ISS.
- Advanced Astroculture (ADVASC), aboard the ISS and Mir.
- Transgenic Arabidopsis Gene Expression System (TAGES), began November 2009 aboard the ISS.
- Plant Signaling (STS-135), began July 2011 aboard the ISS.
- Vegetable Production System (Veggie), began May 2014 aboard the ISS.
- Advanced Plant Habitat, began April 2017 aboard the ISS.
- ECOSTRESS, began June 2018 aboard the ISS.
- Chang'e 4 lunar lander "biosphere" with seeds and insect eggs to test whether plants and insects could hatch and grow together in synergy, began 2019.
- SpaceMoss (SpaceX CRS-18), a NASA experiment studying the growth of the moss Physcomitrella patens in microgravity, began July 2019 aboard the ISS.
- Algae as sustainable food in space.
- North Carolina State University experiment in 2022 which looked at the effect of microgravity on vacuoles.
- University of Florida Institute of Food and Agricultural Sciences (UF/IFAS) experiment; Arabidopsis thaliana plants were grown from seeds on the ISS in early 2024 as part of an epigenetics study.

=== Vegetable Production System experiments ===
The Vegetable Production System (Veggie), began in May 2014 aboard the ISS. This included;

- Veg-01A, growing lettuce on the ISS in 2014.
- Veg-01B, growing red romaine lettuce on the ISS in 2015.
- Veg-01C, growing zinnia flowers on the ISS in 2015.
- VEG-03A, growing red romaine lettuce using a ‘cut-and-come-again repetitive harvest’ technique in 2016.
- VEG-03B, growing Chinese cabbage in 2017.
- VEG-03C, growing Chinese cabbage using a ‘cut-and-come-again repetitive’ harvest technique in 2017.
- VEG-03D, growing mustard, red romaine lettuce and ‘Waldmann’s Green’ lettuce using ‘cut-and-come-again’ repetitive harvest technique in 2017 - this was harvested and eaten on Thanksgiving.
- VEG-03E and VEG-03F, growing mustard, red romaine lettuce and ‘Waldmann’s Green’ lettuce using ‘cut-and-come-again’ repetitive harvest technique in 2018.
- VEG-03G, growing kale and lettuce in 2018.

- The 2019 Veg-03H experiment involved growing Wasabi Mustard Greens and Extra Dwarf Pak Choi on the ISS.
- The 2021 Veg-03I study saw the first successful plant transplants in space, using sprouts, kale and pak choi.
- The 2021 Veg-03J study looked at the use of seed film in growing Extra Dwarf Pak Choi, Amara Mustard and Red Romaine Lettuce for harvesting on the ISS.
- The 2021 VEG-03K and VEG-03L experiments looked at growing Amara mustard; the plants grew for 64 days.
- In 2024, the VEG-04A experiment looked at light quality treatments and their effects on plants across 28 days; the VEG-04B study extended this to 56 days.
- The VEG-05 experiment worked on growing dwarf tomatoes on the ISS.

== See also ==
- Astrobotany
- Bioastronautics
- Biolab (payload rack on Columbus laboratory of the International Space Station)
- Bion
- BIOPAN
- Biosatellite program (series of space biology satellites and experiments)
- Endolith (long lived microorganisms that live inside rocks)
- EXPOSE (ISS experiment that tested organisms in low Earth orbit)
- List of microorganisms tested in outer space
- List of species that have landed on the Moon
- Moon tree (trees grown from Apollo 14 space-flown seeds)
- O/OREOS (orbited Halorubrum chaoviatoris and Bacillus subtilis)
- Space food (plants have formed a component of astronaut food)
- Terraforming
- The Martian, a 2015 American science fiction film in which potatoes are grown on Mars
