= Vegetable Production System =

Plant growth system for space environments

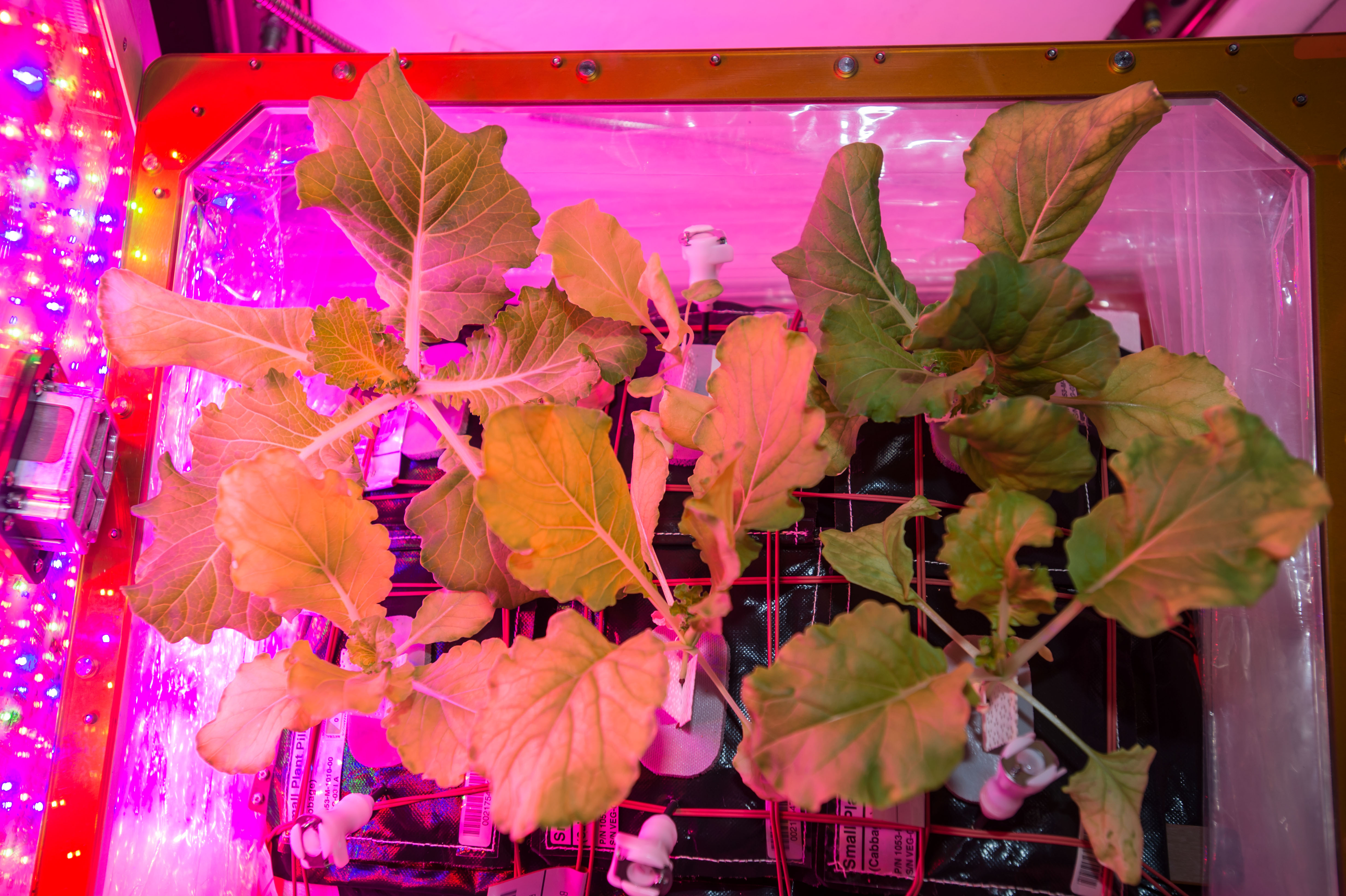
Cabbage growing in a Veggie unit

The Vegetable Production System (Veggie) is a plant growth system developed and used by NASA in space environments. The purpose of Veggie is to provide a self-sufficient and sustainable food source for astronauts as well as a means of recreation and relaxation through therapeutic gardening. Veggie was designed in conjunction with ORBITEC and went operational aboard the International Space Station in 2014, with another Veggie module added to the ISS in 2017.

== Overview ==
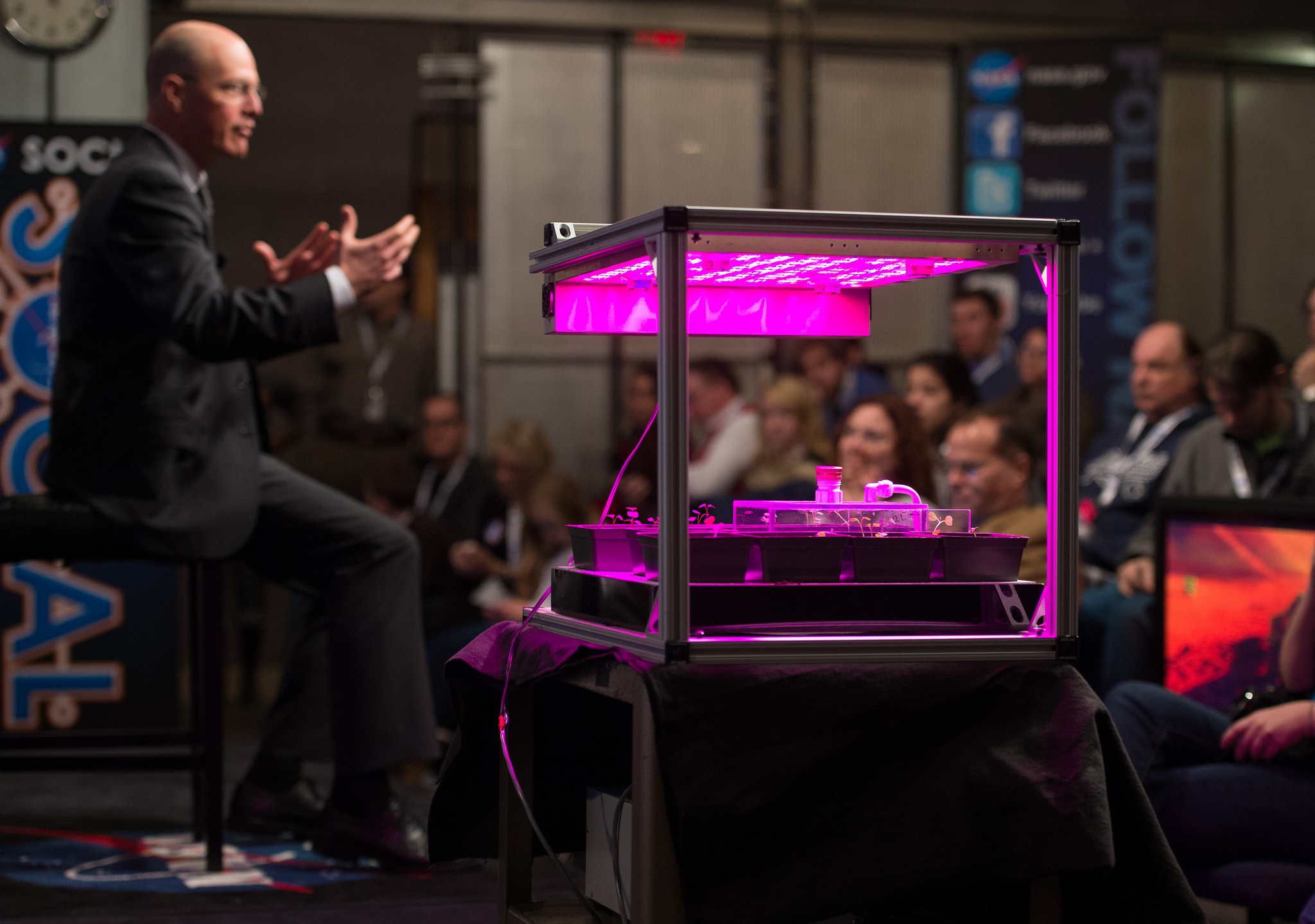
Vegetable Production System for ISS being discussed

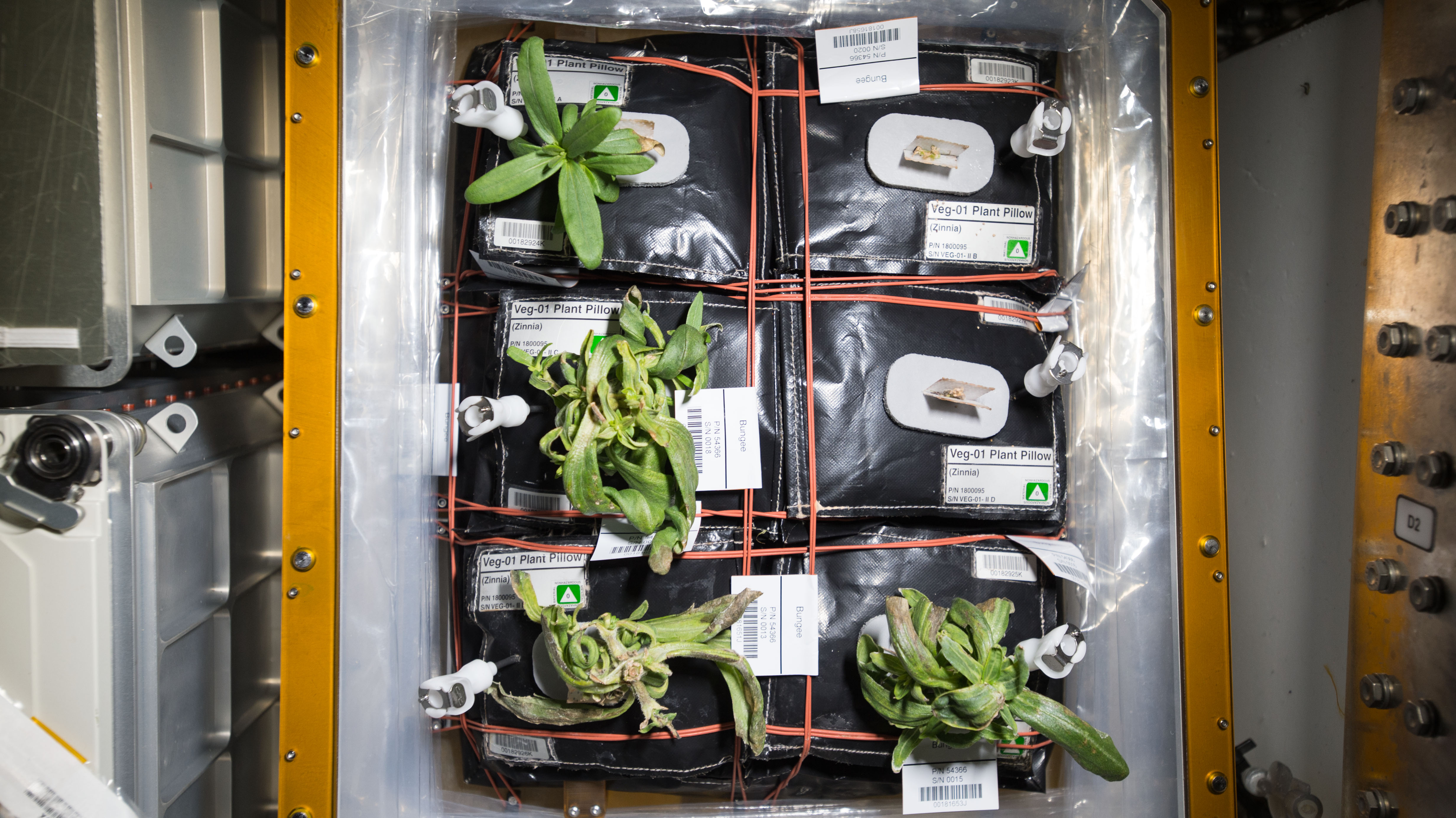
Zinnia becomes first plant to flower in Veggie

The ‘Veggie’ vegetable production system was deployed to the ISS as an applied research platform for food production in space. Among the goals of this project are to learn about how plants grow in a micro-gravity environment and to learn about how plants can efficiently be grown for crew use in space. Veggie was designed to be low maintenance, using low power and having a low launch mass. Thus, Veggie provides a minorly regulated environment with minimal control over the atmosphere and temperature of the module. The successor to the Veggie project is the Advanced Plant Habitat (APH), which was delivered to the International Space Station in 2017.

In 2016 the Veggie-3 experiments (VEG-03 A, B, C, D) grew "outredgeous" red romaine lettuce, Tokyo Bekana Chinese cabbage, Mizuna mustard and Waldmann's Green lettuce.

In 2019 the Veggie-4 experiments (VEG-04 A & B) grew Mizuna mustard aboard the ISS. As of March, 2023, Veggie-5 (VEG-05) successfully grew "red robin" dwarf tomatoes.

== Design ==
A Veggie module weighs less than 8 kg (18 lb) and uses 90 watts. It consists of three parts: a lighting system, a bellows enclosure, and a reservoir. The lighting system regulates the amount and intensity of light plants receive, the bellows enclosure keeps the environment inside the unit separate from its surroundings, and the reservoir connects to plant pillows where the seeds grow.

=== Lighting system ===
Veggie's lighting system consists of three different colors LEDs: red, blue, and green. Each color corresponds to a different light intensity that the plants will receive. Although the lighting system can be reconfigured, the following table shows the default settings and their corresponding intensities in micromoles per second per square meter.

Setting	Red	Blue	Green
Low	120±10%	30±10%	-
Medium	240±10%	60±10%	-
High	360±10%	90±10%	-
On	-	-	30±5%
Potential	550	150	100

In addition to this lighting system, Veggie also uses opaque bellows to obstruct external sources of light.

=== Bellows enclosure ===
The bellows enclosure controls the flow and pressure of air within the container. The bellows are made from a fluorinated polymer and connected to the lighting system at its top and a baseplate at its bottom. Power and cooling is provided to the hardware that powers the bellows by ExPRESS Racks. Although the bellows regulate air flow and air pressure, temperature and humidity are left controlled by the surrounding environment of the Veggie module.

=== Reservoir ===
The reservoir of the Veggie module contains and provides water to the plant pillows in which plants grow. The plant pillows contain all other material such as fertilizer and seeds for the plant to grow. Seeds are oriented inside the sticky plant pillow so that their roots will grow downward into the substrate provided by the plant pillow and their stems will grow upward outside of the plant pillow.

== Plants grown with Veggie ==
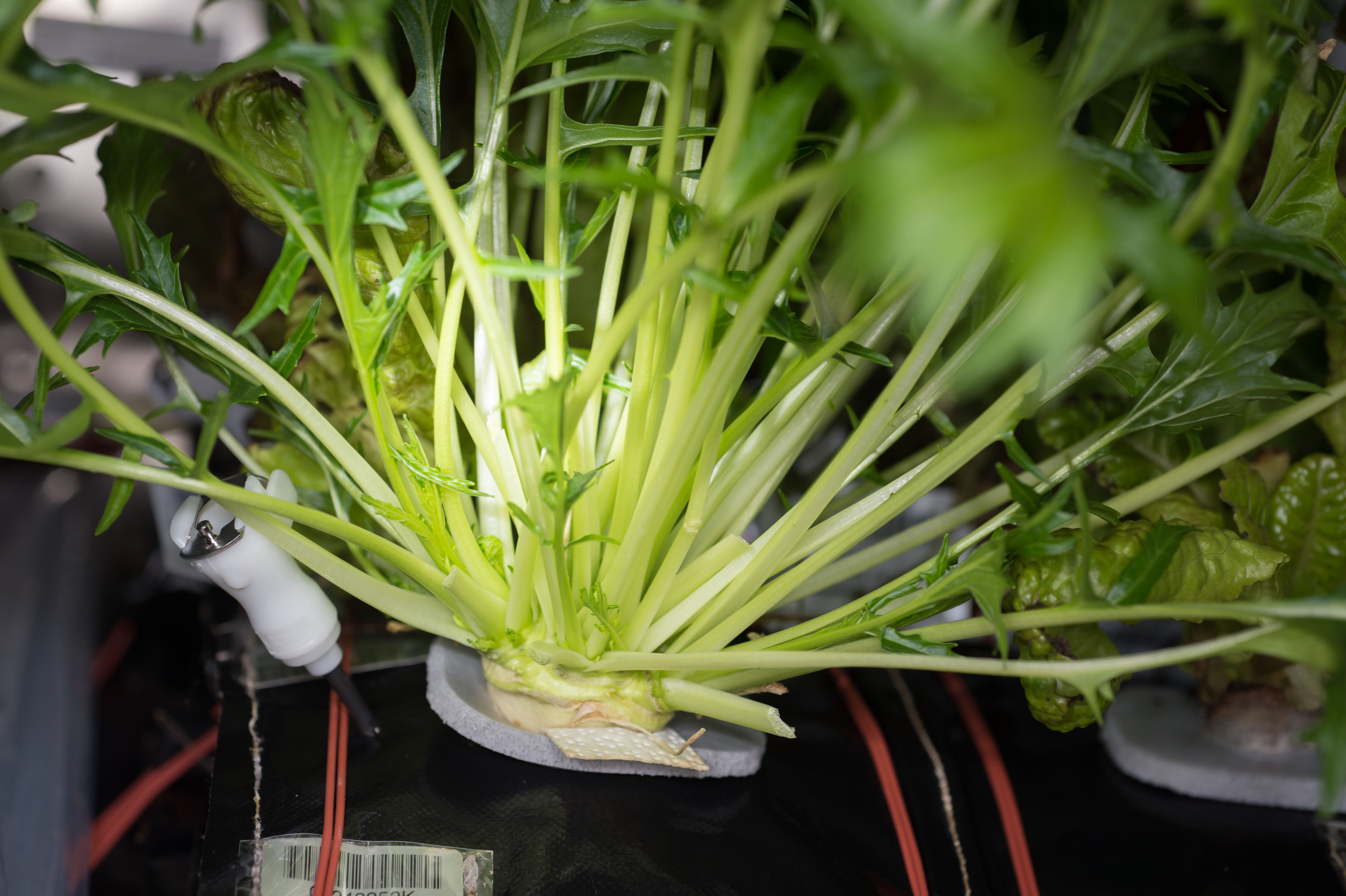
The arugla-like lettuce Mizuna growing for Veg-03

The following plants have been grown using the Vegetable Production System:

- "Outredgeious" romaine lettuce
- Zinnia hybrida ("Profusion" var.)
- Tokyo Bekana Chinese cabbage
- Waldmann's Green Lettuce
- Mizuna mustard
- "Red Robin" dwarf tomatoes

== Results ==
In 2010, Desert Research and Technology Studies (Desert RATS) performed operational tests of the Vegetable Production System with lettuce. The three lettuce cultivars that were initially planted yielded positive results, growing and being consumed in 14 days. The Desert RATS team reported uniformly positive psychological results from the test crew. No substantial information has been released as of yet on the differences between the nutritional values of space-grown plants and earth-grown plants.

In 2015, the Veggie system succeeded in growing edible plants on the ISS. Further, NASA announced plans to launch a more advanced plant growth system named Advanced Plant Habitat in 2017. No results have been recorded on the psychological benefits of the Veggie system in space.

== See also ==
- SVET plant growth system
- Bioastronautics
- Plants in space
- Scientific research on the International Space Station
- Space farming
- Astrobotany
