= Space farming =

Cultivation of crops in space

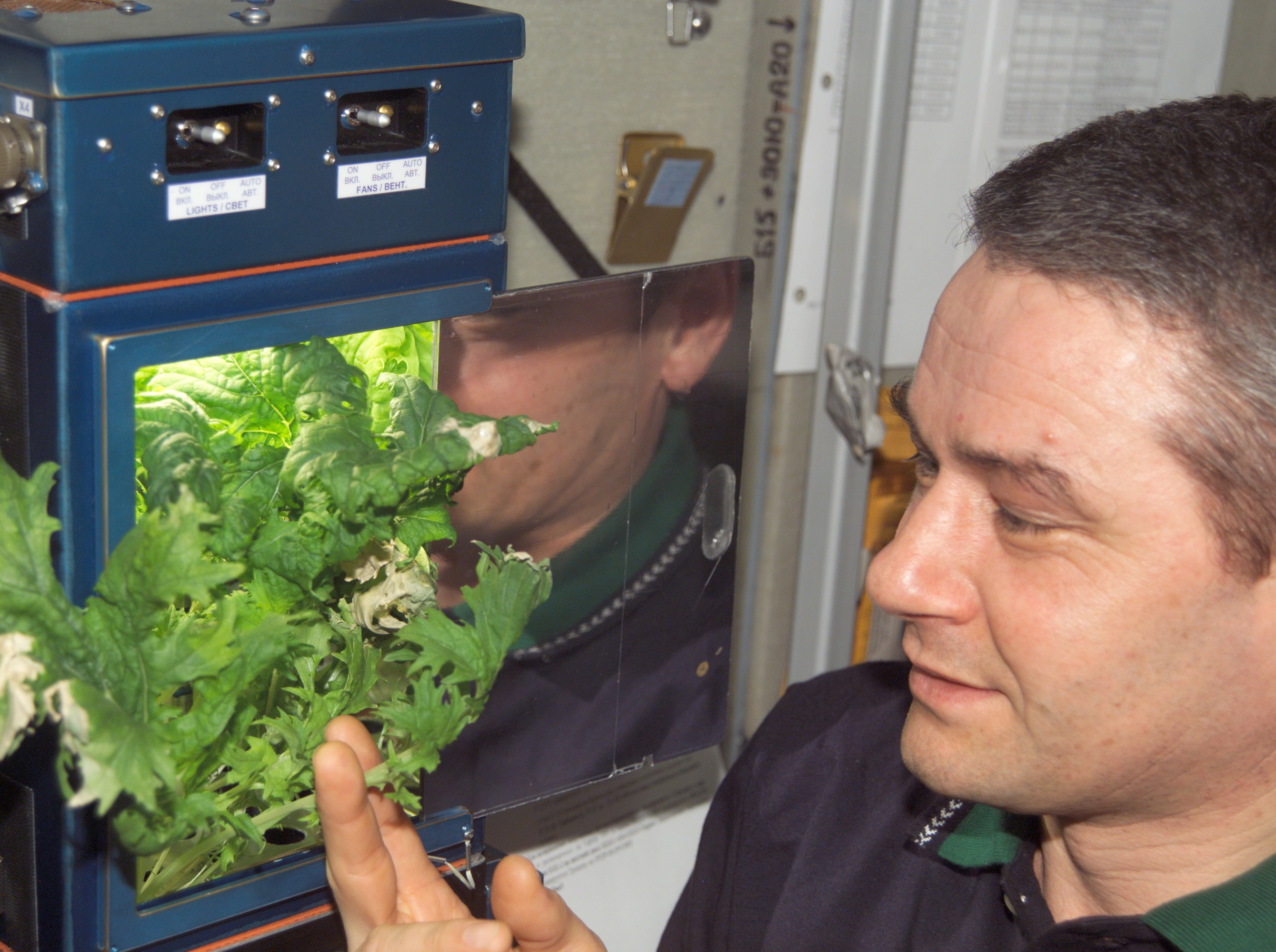
Lada plant growth experiment

Space farming refers to the cultivation of crops for food and other materials in space or on off-Earth celestial objects – equivalent to agriculture on Earth.

Farming on celestial bodies, such as the Moon or Mars, shares many similarities with farming on a space station or space colony. However, farming on celestial bodies may lack the complexity of microgravity, depending on the size of the body. Each environment would have differences in the availability of inputs to the space agriculture process: inorganic material needed for plant growth, soil media, insolation, relative availability of carbon dioxide, nitrogen and oxygen, and so forth.

== History ==
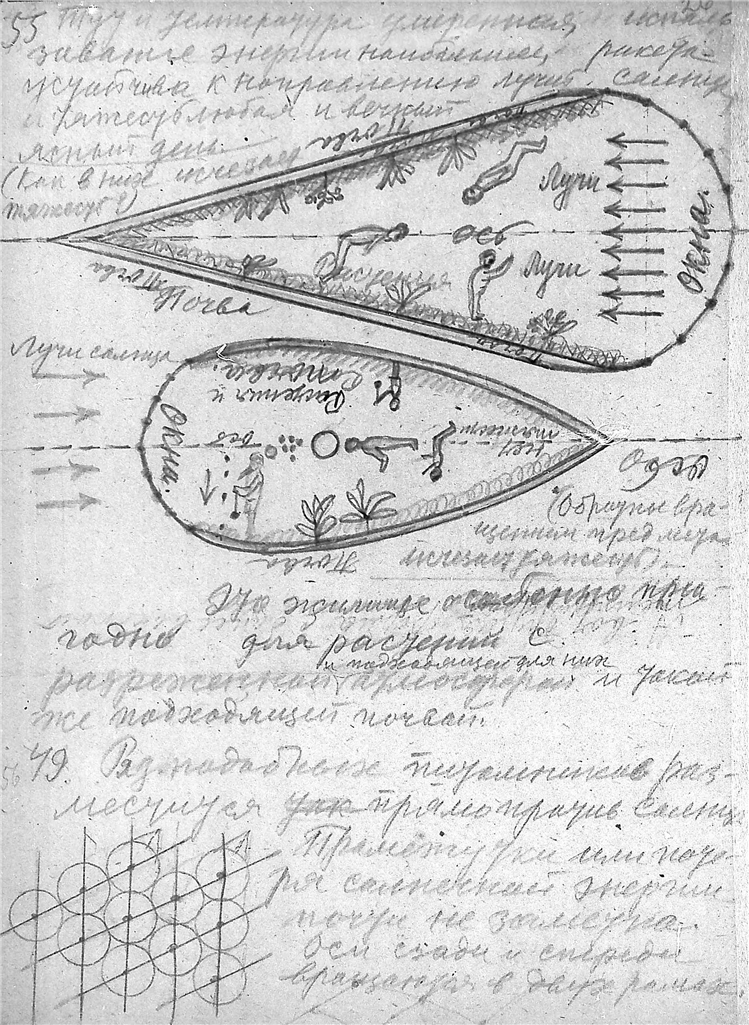
A drawing of people floating in an orbital greenhouse by Konstantin Tsiolkovsky (1933)

Konstantin Tsiolkovsky space pioneer described growing plants in orbital stations by 1933.

== Introduction ==
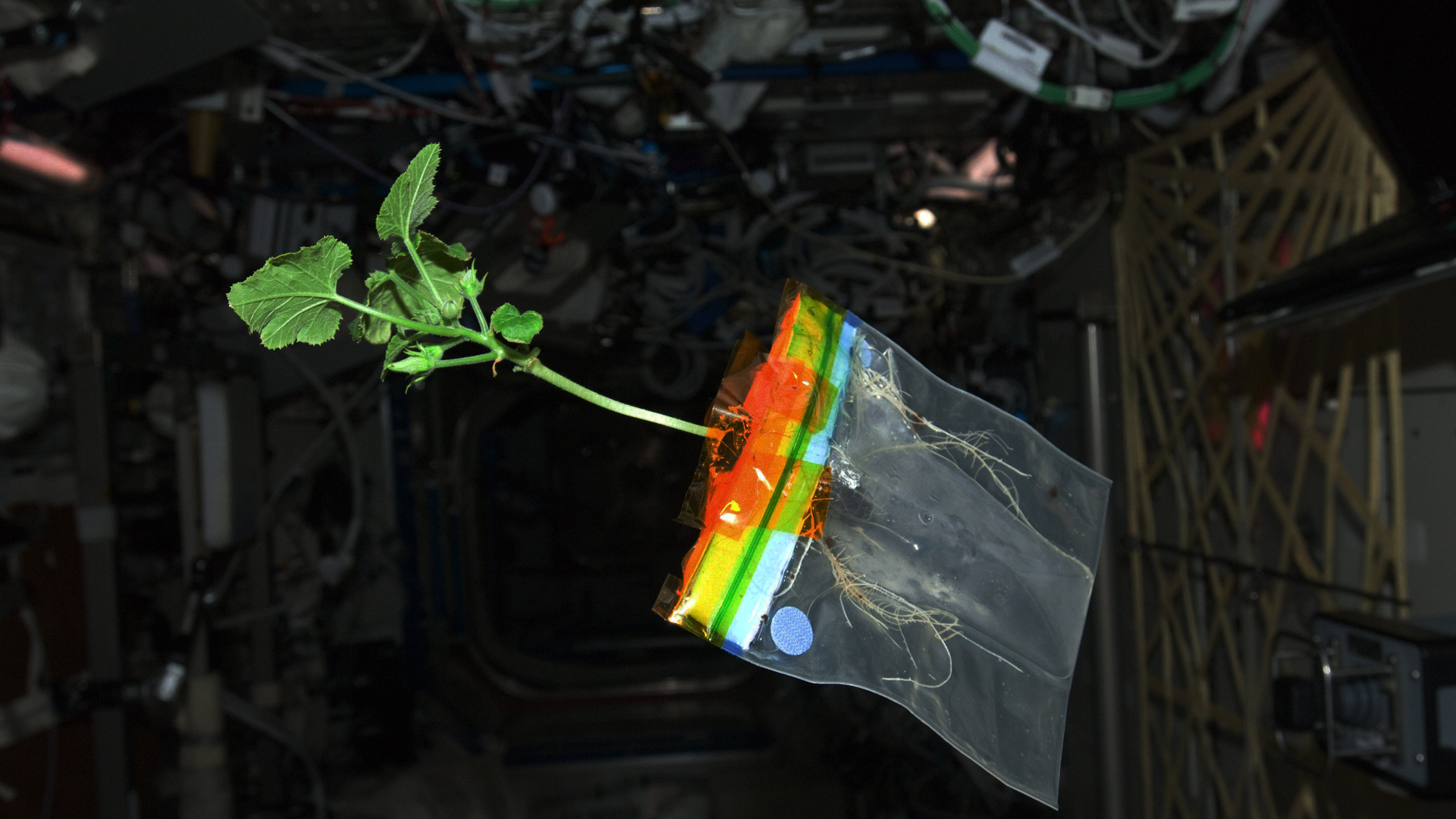
Zucchini plant in the Destiny lab

The supply of food to space stations and other long duration missions is expensive. One astronaut on the International Space Station requires approximately "1.8 kilograms of food and packaging per day". For a long-term mission, such as a four-man crew, three year Martian mission, this number can grow to as much as 24,000 lb (11,000 kg).

Due to the cost of resupply and the impracticality of resupplying interplanetary missions, the prospect of growing food inflight is incredibly appealing. The existence of a space farm would aid the creation of a sustainable environment, as plants can be used to recycle wastewater, generate oxygen, continuously purify the air, and recycle feces on the space station or spaceship. Just 10 m^{2} of crops produces 25% of the daily requirements of 1 person, or about 180-210 grams of oxygen. Essentially, the space farm turns the spaceship into an artificial ecosystem with a hydrological cycle and nutrient recycling.

In addition to maintaining a shelf-life and reducing total mass, the ability to grow food in space would help reduce the vitamin gap in astronaut's diets and provide fresh food with improved taste and texture. Currently, much of the food supplied to astronauts is heat treated or freeze dried. Both of these methods, for the most part, retain the properties of the food pre-treatment. However, vitamin degradation during storage can occur. A 2009 study noted significant decreases in vitamins A, C and K, as well as folic acid and thiamin can occur in as little as one year of storage. A mission to Mars could require food storage for as long as five years; thus, a new source of these vitamins would be required.

Supply of foodstuffs to others is likely to be a major part of early off-Earth settlements. Food production is a non-trivial task and is likely to be one of the most labor-intensive and vital tasks of early colonists. Among others, NASA is researching how to accomplish space farming.

=== Technical challenges ===
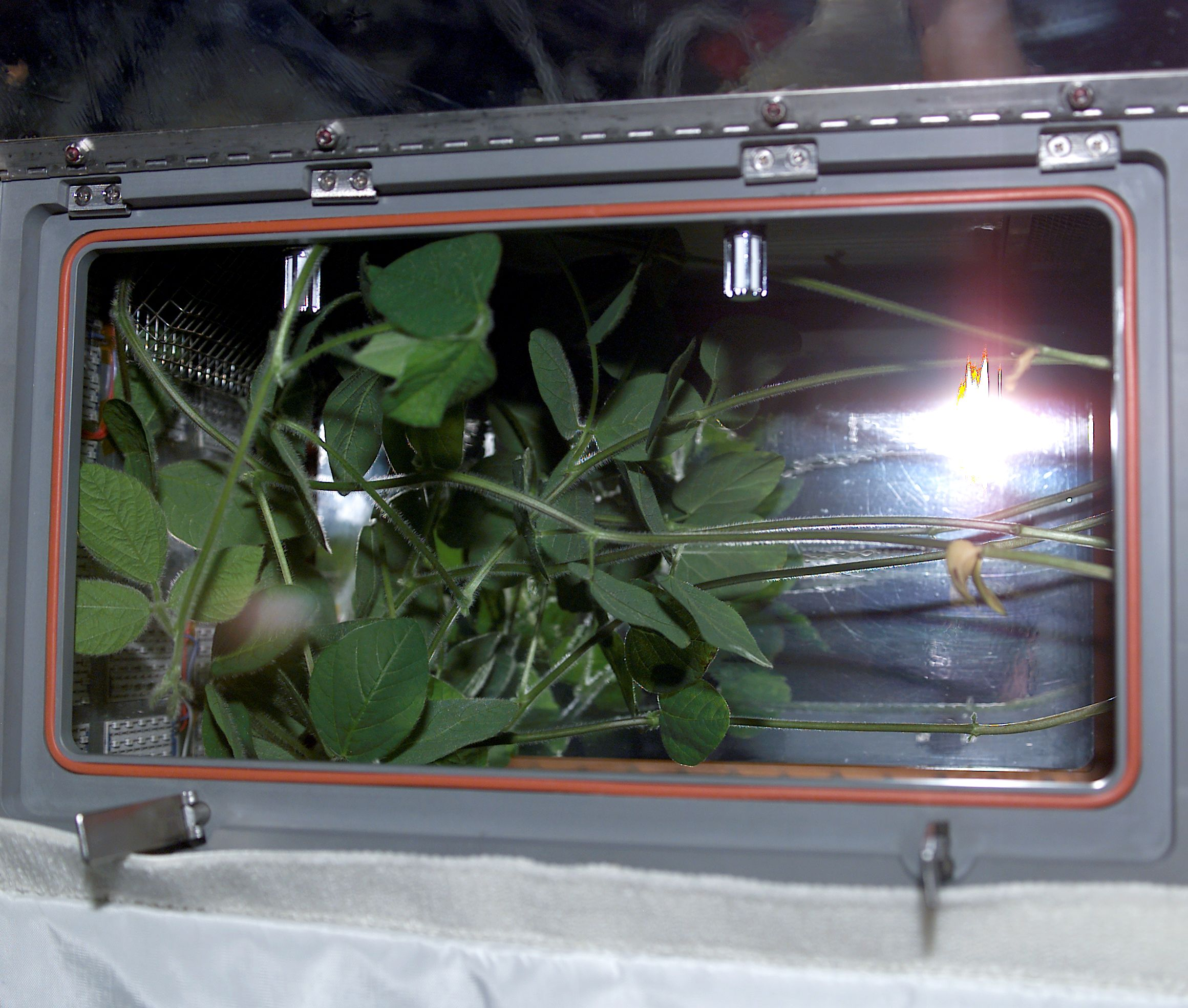
Advanced Astroculture soybean plant growth experiment

A variety of technical challenges will face colonists who attempt to do off-Earth agriculture. These include the effect of reduced gravity, lighting, and pressure, as well as increased radiation. Though greenhouses may solve many of the problems presented by space, their construction would come with their own set of technical challenges.

Plants grown inflight experience a microgravity environment, and plants grown on the surface of Mars experience approximately 1/3 the gravity that Earth plants do. However, plants experience normal growth given that directional light is provided. Normal growth is classified as opposite root and shoot growth direction. This being said, many plants grown in a space flight environment have been significantly smaller than those grown on Earth's surface and grew at a slower rate.

In addition to the varying effects of gravity, plants grown on the surface of Mars will be exposed to much higher levels of radiation than on Earth unless protected. Exposure to high levels of radiation can damage plant DNA, which occurs as highly reactive hydroxyl radicals target DNA. DNA degradation has a direct effect on plant germination, growth and reproduction. Ionizing radiation also has an effect on PSII function and may cause a loss of function and generation of radicals responsible for photo-oxidation. The intensity of these effects vary from species to species.

The low-pressure environment of the surface of Mars has also been a cause for concern. Hypobaric conditions can affect net photosynthesis and evapotranspiration rates. However, a 2006 study suggests maintaining elevated CO_{2} concentrations can mitigate the effects of hypobaric conditions as low as 10 kPa to achieve normal plant growth.

Martian soil contains a majority of the minerals needed for plant growth except reactive nitrogen, which is a product of mineralization of organic matter. Since the Martian surface is deficient in organic matter, reactive nitrogen is lacking. Reactive nitrogen is a required constituent of soil used for plant growth, and it is possible that nitrogen fixing species, such as bacteria, could aide in supplying reactive nitrogen. However, a 2014 study suggested that plants were able to germinate and survive a period of 50 days on a Martian and lunar soil by using simulant soils. This being said, only one of the four experimented species did well enough to achieve full flower formation, and more work is needed to achieve complete growth.

== Experiments ==
Interview with University of Florida horticultural scientists about their space farming experiments

- The "GreenHab" at the Mars Desert Research Station in Utah contains a greenhouse designed to emulate some of the challenges resulting from farming on Mars.
- The Lada experiment and the European Modular Cultivation System on the International Space Station is used to grow small amounts of fresh food.
- In 2013, NASA funded research to develop a 3D food printer.
- The NASA Vegetable Production System, "Veggie," is a deployable unit which aims to produce salad-type crops aboard the International Space Station.
- The 2019 lunar lander Chang'e 4 carries the Lunar Micro Ecosystem, a 3 kg (6.6 lb) sealed "biosphere" cylinder 18 cm long and 16 cm in diameter with seeds and insect eggs to test whether plants and insects could hatch and grow together in synergy.
- The future ALINA lunar lander will carry a small "biosphere" cylinder called Lunar Plant Growth Experiment (LPX), where NASA will attempt to germinate and grow several plant types.
- The EDEN-ISS project was a 4-year project in Antarctica at Neumayer Station III designed to showcase plant cultivation system for future tests on-board ISS and a Future Exploration Greenhouse (FEG) for planetary habitats. The project has since been extended.

=== Crops experimented with ===
Following crops have been considered for use in space farms: potatoes, grains, rice, beans, tomatoes, paprika, lettuce, cabbage, strawberries, onions, and peppers.

== See also ==
- Astrobotany
- Biosphere2
- Bioastronautics
- Generation ship
- Human mission to Mars
- Microgravity
- Plants in space
- Scientific research on the International Space Station
- Vegetable Production System
