= Soup (disambiguation) =

Soup is a primarily liquid food.

Soup may also refer to:

== Arts and entertainment ==
=== Film and television ===
- The Soup (film), a 2017 South Korean film
- Soup (TV series), a New Zealand children's claymation series
- The Soup, an American television show
- "The Soup" (Seinfeld), a 1994 episode

=== Literature ===
- Soup (novel), a 1974 children's novel by Robert Newton Peck

=== Music ===
- Soup (band), a Norwegian progressive post-rock band
- Soup (rapper), American rapper, founding member of Jurassic 5
- Soup (Blind Melon album), 1995
- Soup (The Housemartins and the Beautiful South album), 2007
- Soup (Otomo Yoshihide, Bill Laswell and Yasuhiro Yoshigaki album), 2003
- Soup (EP), by A Will Away, 2019
- "Soup", a song by Headswim from Flood, 1994

== Computing ==
- Soup (Apple), a file system for the Apple Newton platform
- Software of unknown pedigree, used in various American and British standards concerning software system certification
- Soup.io, a social networking and microblogging site

== Nickname ==
- Soup Cable (1913–1995), American basketball player
- Bill Campbell (baseball) (born 1948), American baseball player
- Dave Campbell (infielder) (born 1942), American baseball player and broadcaster
- Eric Campbell (baseball) (born 1987), American baseball player
- Soup Campbell (1915–2000), American baseball player
- Jeff Suppan (born 1975), American baseball player

== See also ==
- Soop (disambiguation)
- Soupy (disambiguation)
- Supe (disambiguation)
