= EuCROPIS =

German satellite

Eu:CROPIS
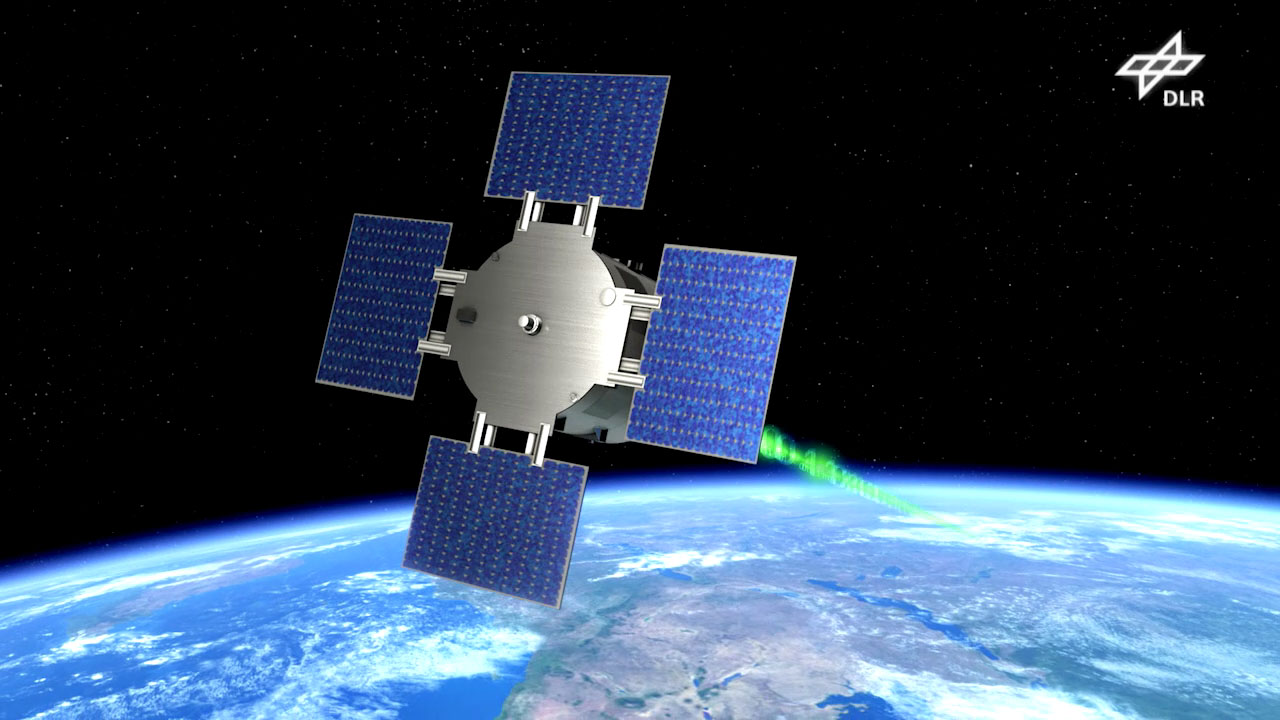
- Render of the Eu:CROPIS satellite after launch
- Mission type: Life sciences research
- Operator: German Aerospace Center
- COSPAR ID: 2018-099BB
- SATCAT no.: 43807
- Mission duration: Planned: 1 year Final: 1 year and 28 days

Spacecraft properties
- Bus: DLR Compact Satellite bus
- Manufacturer: DLR
- Launch mass: 250 kg (550 lb)
- Dimensions: 1.0 m diameter x 1.13 m length with panels deployed: 2.88 m wide
- Power: 520 W, 4 solar arrays, Li-ion batteries

Start of mission
- Launch date: 3 December 2018
- Rocket: Falcon 9 (Block 5)
- Launch site: Vandenberg Air Force Base
- Contractor: SpaceX

End of mission
- Disposal: End of Mission 31 December 2019
- Deactivated: 31 December 2022

Orbital parameters
- Reference system: Geocentric
- Regime: Low Earth (SSO)
- Perigee altitude: 575 km (357 mi)
- Inclination: 98°
- Period: 10 h
- Epoch: Planned

Transponders
- Band: S band

Eu:CROPIS (Euglena and Combined Regenerative Organic-Food Production in Space) was a life science satellite developed by the German Aerospace Center (DLR) and intended to investigate the possibility of growing plants (specifically tomatoes) in different levels of gravity, such as that of the Moon and Mars, as a sustainable food source using human urine for moisture and as the source of fixed nitrogen.

== Overview ==
This orbital mission was intended to simulate two greenhouses that could be scaled up and assembled inside a lunar or Martian habitat to provide the crew with a local source of fresh food, while recycling human urine into fertiliser. Some microorganisms would be added to convert synthetic urine into easily digestible fertilisers for the tomatoes. The aim was to develop a stable, closed-loop, bio-regenerative life support system functioning in low gravity.

In more detail, porous lava stones were fitted in trickle filters and dried soil containing normal soil microbial colonies. Microbes would then use nitrite (NO^{−}_{2}) to convert the harmful ammonia (NH_{3}) into nitrate (NO^{−}_{3}), which is then added to six tomato seeds as liquid fertiliser. In addition, the system incorporated a colony of the single-cell microorganism Euglena gracilis, a photosynthetic alga able to produce oxygen and biomass while protecting the entire system against high ammonia concentrations. This oxygen is necessary for the conversion of urine to nitrate until the photosynthetic oxygen production by the tomatoes is sufficient.

The spacecraft was designed replicate lunar gravity on one greenhouse for a period of six months before simulating Martian gravity on the second greenhouse for the next six months. The level of gravity on the Moon (0.16 g) and Mars (0.38 g) was simulated by rotating the spacecraft's cylindrical body around its longitudinal axis. The various payload experiments were placed in different areas within the cylinder. Tomato seed germination and plant growth were monitored with 16 cameras, while the RAMIS (RAdiation Measurement In Space) radiometers monitored the radiation inside and outside the spacecraft.

The greenhouse was made of clear polycarbonate, with an approximate volume of 12 L (730 in^{3}). The closed system featured moisture, pH, oxygen, pressure and temperature sensors, and was capable of controlling these parameters. Four small fans created airflow through a cooling device to maintain a stable "atmospheric" temperature. On top of the greenhouse, three lamps provided light in the correct spectrum for photosynthesis. Scanners and fluorometers measured cell density and photosynthetic yield. The fluids were to be monitored with seven electrodes to measure ammonium, nitrite, nitrate, pH, chloride, sodium, and potassium.

To monitor the health of Euglena gracilis, the system also analysed the microbes' mRNA to determine which proteins —and therefore which genes— were being commanded into action.

== Objectives ==
The aim was to develop a stable, and symbiotic biological life support system while being exposed to gravity levels similar to those on the lunar surface as well as the surface of Mars. Both phases of experimentation would last for six months. With water being the only component that has been recycled so far and all other components being extracted and disposed, processing of urine is an issue in human space flight. Eu:CROPIS was intended to examine the possibility of using previously disposed waste to grow fruits and vegetables after proper conversion. Two life support systems (a nitrifying trickle filter system and the single-celled algae Euglena gracilis) within the satellite were to be used for producing biomass out of artificial urine in a closed system. Furthermore, the algae Euglena gracilis would protect the biosystem against high levels of ammonia present in urine.

== Supporting science payloads ==
- PowerCell (Payload 2, from NASA Ames Research Center) will investigate the performance of microbial mini-ecologies. These will contain the carbohydrate (sugar) products of photosynthesis, which will feed Bacillus subtilis, a robust bacterium commonly found in soil and the gut, which has already proven that it can withstand the rigors of space while in the spore form. A second objective of the PowerCell Payload is to conduct synthetic biology remotely in outer space. The basic technique for introducing genetic material into a living cell, called transformation, involves the transfer across a cells encasing membrane of genetic material. The PowerCell payload will examine if and how reduced gravity levels affect transformation processes. The third objective is to test protein production under different gravity regimes. Using the tools of synthetic biology, B. subtilis was engineered to produce several proteins which will be produced at the three different space gravity regimes. The ability to make proteins in space will be fundamental for human exploration, as proteins will be used to produce a range of critical substances, from on-demand food and vaccines to building materials.
- Radiation Measurement in Space (Payload 3) has the goal of collecting data on long-term exposure to cosmic radiation over the course of the space flight
- SCORE (Payload 4) is a technology demonstrator for next generation on-board computing in hardware and software developed by the DLR Institute of Space Systems. It is complemented by a set of three cameras that are commanded via SCORE.

== Satellite characteristics ==
Both the satellite and the experiment are called Eu:CROPIS. The satellite features four gyroscopes, two magnetometers, three magnetic torque rods and a Sun sensor in combination with a single-frequency Phoenix GPS receiver for attitude control. The power for the satellite is provided by an Electrical Power Subsystem, which includes a lithium-ion battery and four deployable fixed solar arrays delivering an average of 520 W of power.

== Results ==
The Eu:CROPIS mission ended on 31 December 2019. The three supporting payloads generated large amounts of data, but the eponymous Eu:CROPIS experiment failed to activate due to a software problem. The satellite is expected to slowly de-orbit over the next two decades before reentering Earth's atmosphere.

== See also ==
- List of microorganisms tested in outer space
- Plants in space
