= Supes =

Supes may refer to:

- A nickname for the DC Comics character Superman
- A nickname for the American basketball team Seattle SuperSonics
- Fictional superhumans in the comic book series The Boys

== See also ==
- Supe (disambiguation)
