= Supe =

Supe or SUPE may refer to:

== Places ==
- Supe District, Peru
- Supe, Ethiopia, a town in the woreda of Supena Sodo
- Supa, Parner, a village in India, also known as Supe

=== Other places ===
- El Jagüel Airport (ICAO: SUPE), an airport in Punta del Este, Uruguay

== Entertainment ==
- Michael "Supe" Granda, a member of Trent Summar & the New Row Mob, an American country music group
- Supe, nickname of the title character of Superkatt, an American comic book series
- Supe, a fictional superhuman in the comic book series The Boys
- Short for supernumerary actor

== Other uses ==
- Unión Supe, a football club in Supe, Peru
- Superessive case, a grammatical case abbreviated SUPE

== See also ==
- Supes (disambiguation)
- Soop (disambiguation)
- Soup (disambiguation)
