= Soop =

Soop may refer to:

- Management Soop, a South Korean actors agency
- Soop (Southwest Papua), an island of Indonesia
- Soop (family), a Swedish noble family
- Soop (service), a South Korean video service

== See also ==
- Soup (disambiguation)
- Supe (disambiguation)
