= Soupy =

Soupy may refer to:

== Personal nickname ==
- Andrew Campbell (ice hockey) (born 1988), Canadian hockey player
- Dan Campbell (singer), lead singer of the American rock band The Wonder Years
- Jerry Campbell (1944–2017), American-Canadian football player
- Stefan Campbell, Gaelic footballer for Armagh
- Jack Shapiro (1907–2001), American football player, the shortest in National Football League history

== Arts and entertainment ==
- Soupy Sales, stage name of American comedian and actor Milton Supman (1926–2009)
- the title character of Soupy Norman, an Irish-Polish television programme broadcast by RTÉ from 2007 to 2008
- Jimmy "Soupy" Campbell, a minor character in Sister, Sister, a 1990s American sitcom
- "Soupy", a 1965 song by Maggie Thrett
