= Vegetable (disambiguation) =

A vegetable is a plant, or part of a plant, that is commonly consumed by people as food.

Vegetable may also refer to:

- "Vegetables (song)", a song appearing on albums by the Beach Boys and Brian Wilson
- "Vegetable", the eighth track on Radiohead debut studio album Pablo Honey
- A person in a persistent vegetative state

== See also ==
- Veggies (disambiguation)
