= ECOSTRESS =

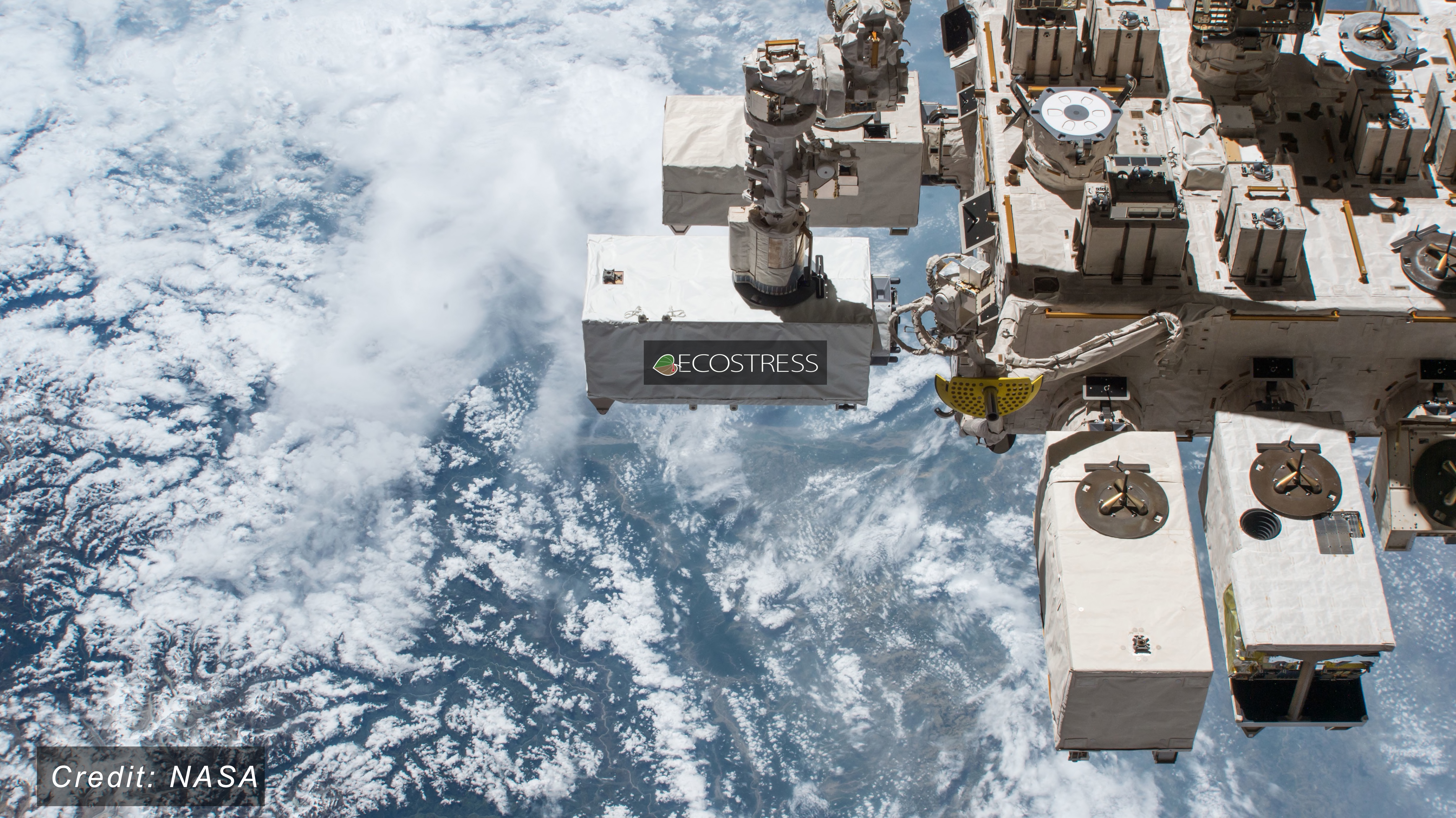
ECOSTRESS radiometer

ECOSTRESS (Ecosystem Spaceborne Thermal Radiometer Experiment on Space Station) is an ongoing scientific experiment in which a radiometer mounted on the International Space Station (ISS) measures the temperature of plants growing in specific locations on Earth over the course of a solar year. These measurements give scientists insight into the effects of events like heat waves and droughts on crops.

More specifically, ECOSTRESS seeks to answer three questions:

1. How is the terrestrial biosphere responding to changes in water availability?
2. How do changes in the water stress experienced by diurnal vegetation impact the global carbon cycle?
3. Can agricultural vulnerability be reduced through advanced monitoring of the consumptive use of water for agriculture, and by improved estimation of the severity of droughts?

ECOSTRESS data has many other uses, such as comparing the temperatures of man-made surfaces (such as paved roads) and natural surfaces (such as prairie land) over time.

== ECOSTRESS radiometer ==
The instrument that collects ECOSTRESS data is a multispectral, thermal, infrared radiometer. It measures temperatures on the surface of the Earth, rather than surface air temperature.

ECOSTRESS data is archived at the Land Processes Distributed Active Archive Center (LP DAAC), which is a data center managed by the United States Geological Survey (USGS). ECOSTRESS data is discoverable through various platforms including through LP DAAC's AppEEARS (Application for Extracting and Exploring Analysis Ready Samples) tool, which allows users to quickly subset and reproject data into a geographic lat/lot format. The data collected is also published via the open-access TERN Data Discovery Portal in Australia.

The ECOSTRESS radiometer was built at JPL and consisted of 5 spectral bands in the thermal infrared (8-12 micron) and 1 band in the shortwave infrared, which is used for geolocation. ECOSTRESS was delivered to the ISS by the SpaceX Dragon after a launch out of Cape Canaveral, Florida on 29 June 2018 The Dragon arrived at the space station on 3 July 2018. The radiometer was mounted on the station's Kibo module. The radiometer constituted about 550 kg (1,210 lb) of the 2,700 kg (6,000 lb) of cargo on board the Dragon. Other cargo included spare parts for the Canadarm2 robotic arm, as well as other equipment and supplies.

The high-resolution images have a pixel size of 69 by 38 meters (226 by 125 ft).

== Participating scientists ==
The original ECOSTRESS Science Team comprised Dr. Glynn Hulley at NASA's Jet Propulsion Laboratory (JPL), with scientists at the United States Department of Agriculture, including Dr. Andrew French and Dr. Martha Anderson.

Dr. Simon Hook of JPL is the principal investigator of the ECOSTRESS mission; Dr. Joshua Fisher (also of JPL) is the science lead. Additional members of the science team are Drs. Eric Wood of Princeton University, Rick Allen of the University of Idaho, and Chris Hain of the Marshall Space Flight Center.

== Science data products ==
Science data products produced by ECOSTRESS
Data product	Description	Pixel-spacing resolution (Meters)
ECO1BRAD.001	Radiance	70 × 70
ECO1BATT.001	Attitude and ephemeris	70 × 70
ECO1BMAPRAD.001	Projected radiance	70 × 70
ECO1BGEO.001	Geolocation	70 × 70
ECO2LSTE.001	Land surface temperature and emissivity	70 × 70
ECO2CLD.001	Cloud mask	70 × 70
ECO3ETPTJPL.001	Evapotranspiration (PT-JPL model enhanced)	70 × 70
ECO3ANCQA.001	Ancillary data quality	70 × 70
ECO3ETALEXIU.001	Evapotranspiration (ALEXI model enhanced)	30 × 30 (resampled from 70 × 70)
ECO4ESIPTJPL.001	Evaporative Stress Index derived from L3_ET_PT-JPL	70 × 70
ECO4ESIALEXIU.001	Evaporative Stress Index derived from L3_ET_ALEXI	30 × 30 (resampled from 70 × 70)
ECO4WUE.001	Efficiency of water use	70 × 70

Image data is captured over the continental United States and target areas every one to seven days.

=== Early adopters program ===
ECOSTRESS was the first Earth Venture Mission (EVM) to establish an early adopters program. The program grants its members access to provisional data, plus opportunities to collaborate with other ECOSTRESS users in a Slack channel. As of August 2019, the Early Adopters Program has transitioned to the ECOSTRESS Community of Practice, with over 250 members.

== See also ==
- Effects of climate change on plant biodiversity
- Effects of global warming
- Hardiness (plants)
- Scientific research on the International Space Station
- Water scarcity
