= SVET plant growth system =

Space greenhouse on the Kristall module of the space station Mir

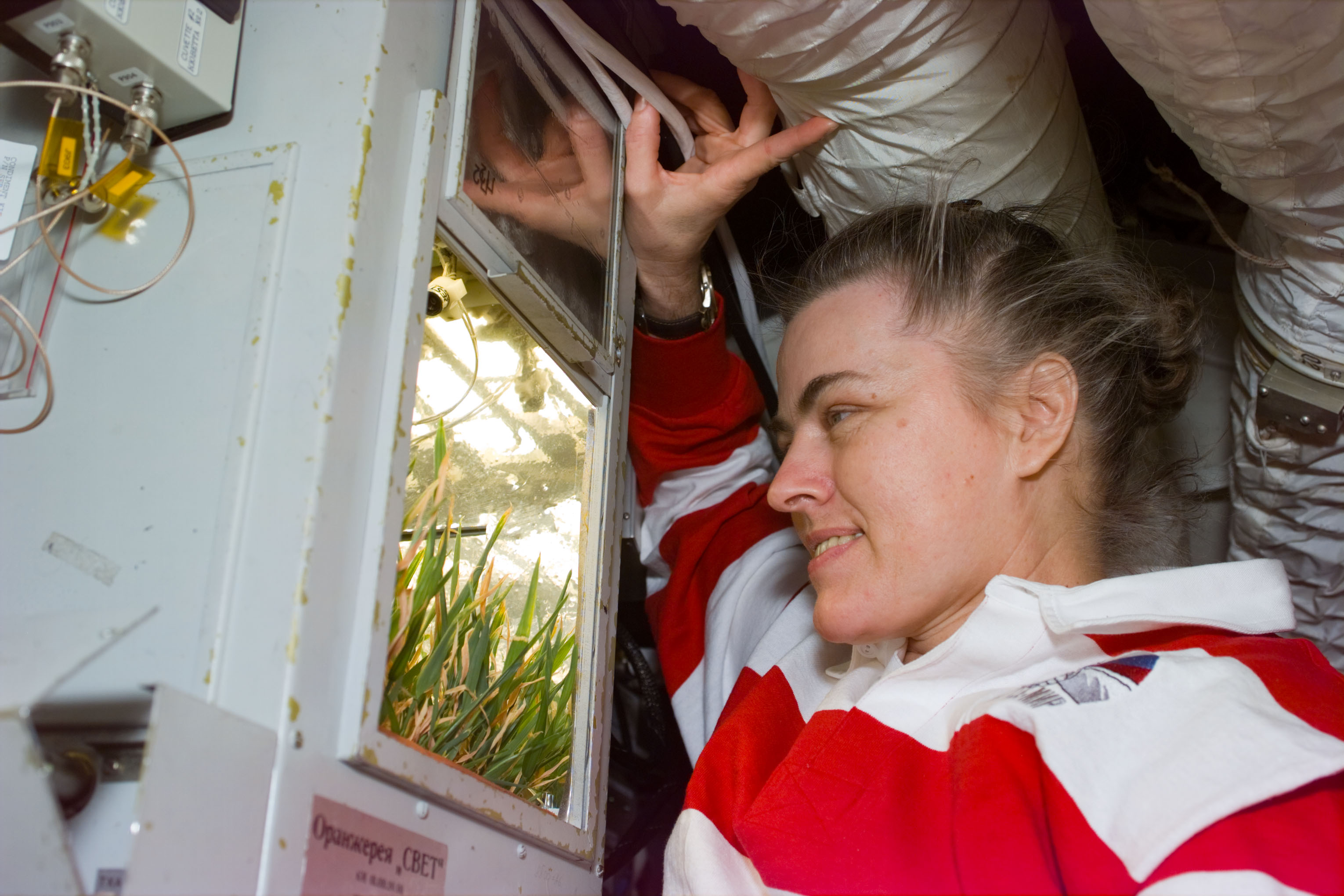
Astronaut Shannon Lucid looking at wheat growing in the Svet

SVET (Russian: свет, "light") was a plant cultivation unit on the Kristall module of the Mir space station. It was installed in 1990 and operated until 2001. Several experiments achieving successful seed-to-seed plant growth were conducted there between 1997 and 1999.

== Foundation and Hardware ==
The project was a joint Russian-Bulgarian one, developed at the Space Research and Technology Institute in Sofia. The greenhouse was later upgraded as part of a cooperative experiment carried out by Institute of Biomedical Problems in Moscow and Utah State University. Svet had a cultivation area of 0.1 square metres (1.1 sq ft) and was capable of maintaining static air temperature and substrate moisture.

== Experiments ==
In 1995–1996, wheat was successfully grown in the unit. The experiment was the first to show that a full wheat growth life cycle can be achieved in space. While seeds weren't formed in these experiments, this was attributed to a high level of ethylene in the station atmosphere.

In another experiment, full seed-to-seed plant growth was achieved in 1997, when Brassica rapa was successfully grown there. Later experiments in 1998 and 1999 achieved full growth life cycle with Apogee wheat less sensitive to ethylene.

== Legacy ==
Following the experiments, Lada plant growth unit was developed jointly by Institute of Biomedical Problems and Utah State University Space Dynamics Laboratory to succeed the SVET unit. It was installed on Zvezda (ISS module).

== See also ==
- Plants in space
