= Mesclun =

Mix of young salad greens originating in Provence, France

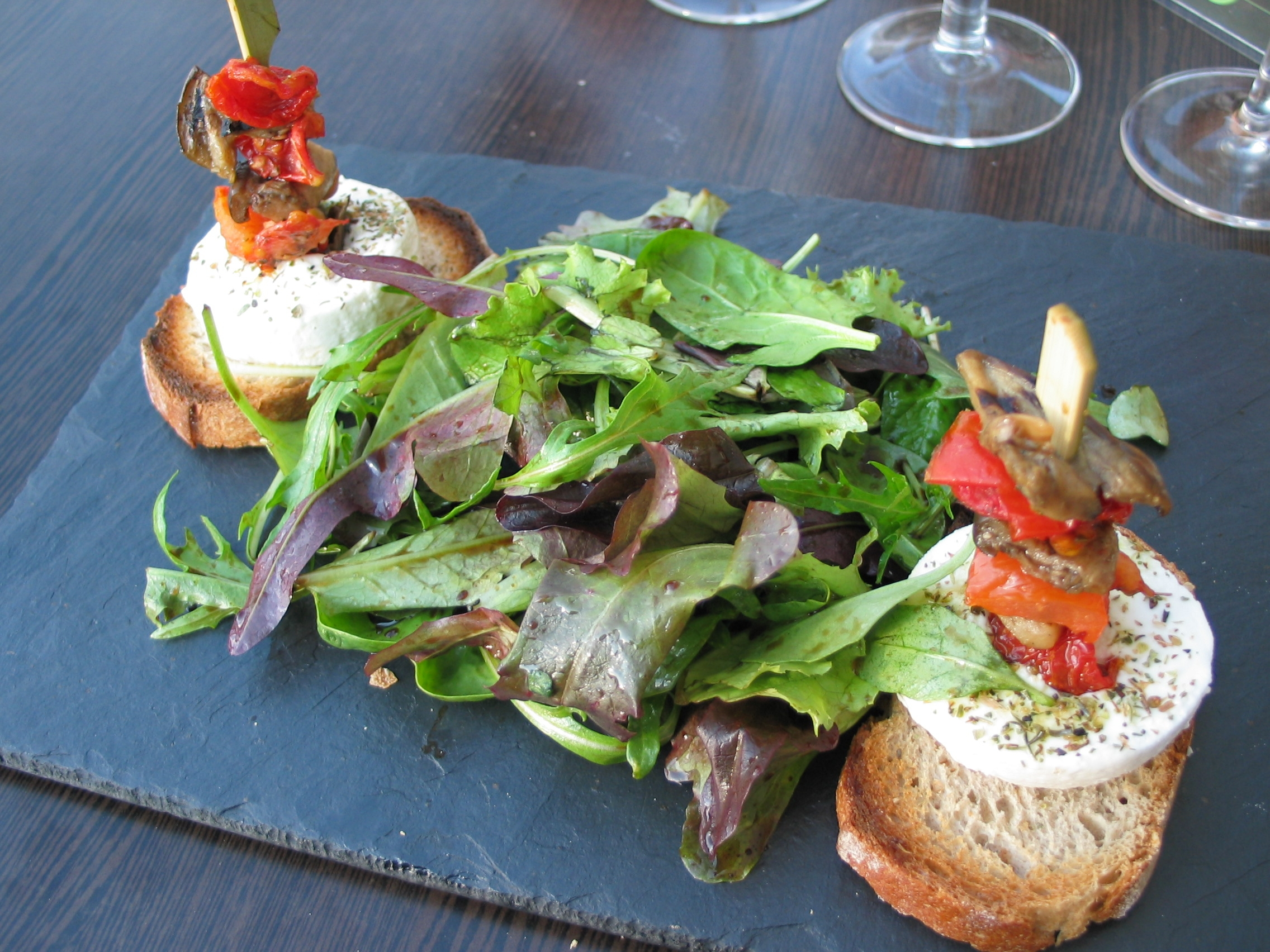
- Type: Salad
- Place of origin: France
- Region or state: Provence
- Main ingredients: Chervil, arugula, leafy lettuces, endive, chive

Mesclun (French pronunciation: [mɛsˈklœ̃]) is a mix of assorted small young salad greens that originated in Provence, France. The traditional mix includes chervil, arugula, leafy lettuces and endive, while the term mesclun may also refer to a blend that might include some or all of these four and baby spinach, collard greens, Swiss chard (silver beet), mustard greens, dandelion greens, frisée, mizuna, mâche (lamb's lettuce), radicchio, sorrel, or other fresh leaf vegetables.

== Origins ==
On July 10, 1924, in Paris, Philippe Tiranty and Paul Gordeaux reunited with many friends at the Cochon d'Or (a famous restaurant in La Villette), decided to create the foyer des Amitiés niçoises, and to call it Lou Mesclun. For these comedians and humanists, this expression meant "real living together".

The term mesclun for a mixture of young salad greens is quite recent, first used in 1976 according to Merriam-Webster. Of Provençal dialect origin, it derives from the verb mesclar, to "mix thoroughly" and literally means "mixture". According to local lore, mesclun originated with the farmers around Nice, who would each bring their own unique and prized mix of baby greens to the farmers' markets. One of the most representative and authentic versions combined baby dandelion, lettuce and rocket (arugula).

Noted chef Alice Waters comments, "Outdoor markets in Provence display mesclun in profusion, a melange of the first tender young leaves which appear in the garden. Mesclun can be an extraordinary lettuce mixture: rocket, much like the rugola (arugula) found in Italian markets, chervil, mâche or lamb's lettuce and oakleaf lettuce. On occasion, baby curly endive (chicory) or young dandelion greens find their way into the medley, depending solely upon the grower's personal preferences combined with the reality of whatever else might send up shoots in the spot where mesclun grows."

== Spring mix ==
In the North American foodservice industry, the first appearance of mesclun traces to restaurants and farm stands in the early 1980s, with a rise in popularity since. A mesclun mix can be described as comprising baby leaves of lettuces and other greens (and often herbs) in a wide range of leaf shapes, colors, textures and tastes. While the overwhelming amount of mesclun sold approximates the traditional blend of chervil, arugula, leafy lettuces and endive, depending on the season, anywhere from a dozen to three dozen different varieties of baby greens, including red and green oak leaves, romaine and lollo rossa lettuces, frisée, tatsoi, bok choy (joi choi), arugula, spinach, orach, mizuna, dandelion, mustard greens and garden cress may compose what is commercially referred to as a "spring mix". When available, locally grown, direct-from-the-farmer sourcing is recommended over commercial bulk packs for best flavor and freshness.

== See also ==
- List of salads
