= Aphanomyces raphani =

Scientific classification
- Domain: Eukaryota
- Clade: Sar
- Clade: Stramenopiles
- Phylum: Oomycota
- Class: Saprolegniomycetes
- Order: Saprolegniales
- Family: Leptolegniaceae
- Genus: Aphanomyces
- Species: A. raphani

Binomial name
- Aphanomyces raphani J.B. Kendr., (1927)

Species of single-celled organism

Aphanomyces raphani, also known as Radish black root disease, is a fungal plant pathogen of various species of Brassicaceae. It is a necrotrophic pathogen causing small black water soaked lesions on its hosts which become rapidly colonised by other fungi and bacteria.

== Hosts ==
- Brassica alboglabra
- Brassica campestris var. pekinensis
- Brassica napus
- Brassica chinensis
- Brassica juncea
- Brassica napobrassica
- Brassica nigra
- Brassica oleracea varieties
- Brassica perviridis
- Brassica robertiana
- Crambe abyssinica
- Lunaria annua
- Raphanus raphanistrum
- Raphanus sativas
- Sinapis alba
