= Bomdong =

Type of early spring cabbage

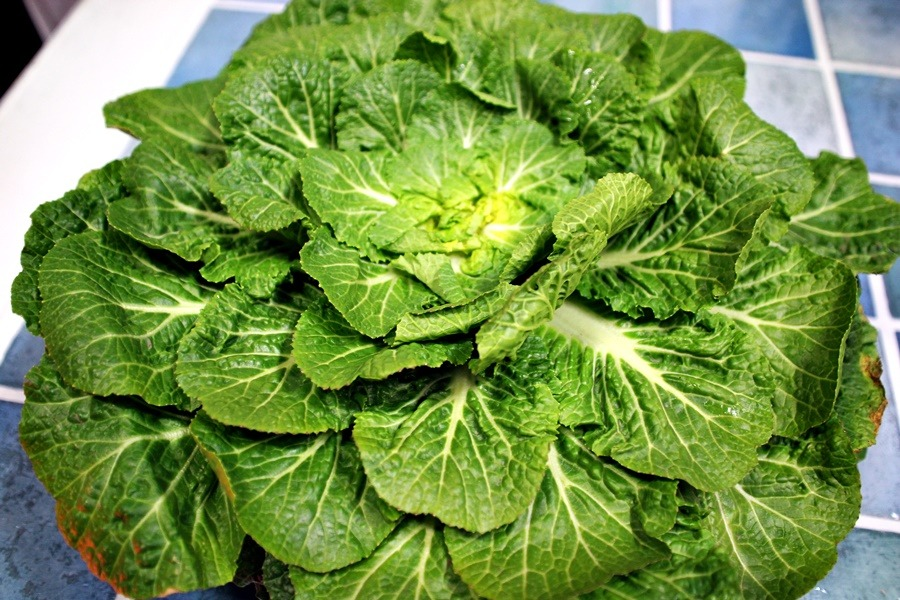
- Species: Brassica rapa
- Cultivar group: Pekinensis group
- Cultivar: Bomdong

Korean name
- Hangul: 봄동
- RR: bomdong
- MR: pomtong
- IPA: pom.t͈oŋ

Bomdong (Korean: 봄동), also known as spring cabbage, is a hardy cabbage with tough, sweet leaves. The leaves of bomdong, unlike those of regular napa cabbages, fall to the sides, giving the plant a flat shape. This cabbage is primarily used in the making of kimchi and salads. 70% of the bomdong grown in Korea comes from South Jeolla province, near Haenam and Jindo.

== Growth ==
Bomdong is picked between January and March. During growth, they spread out like a flower.

== Culinary use ==
In Korea, bomdong is made into geotjeori (fresh kimchi).

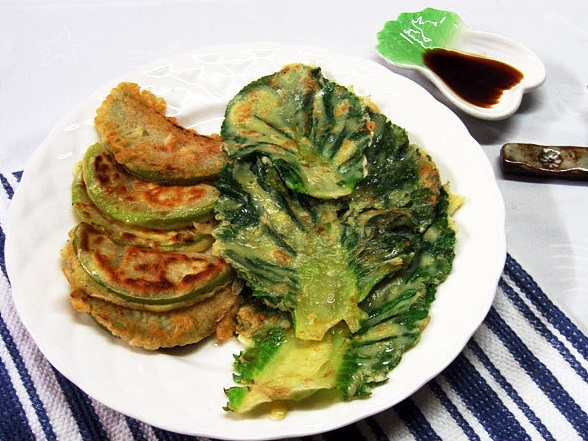
Bomdong-jeon (pan-fried bomdong) and Mujeon (pan-fried radish)
