= Wisconsin Fast Plants =

Cultivar of Brassica rapa

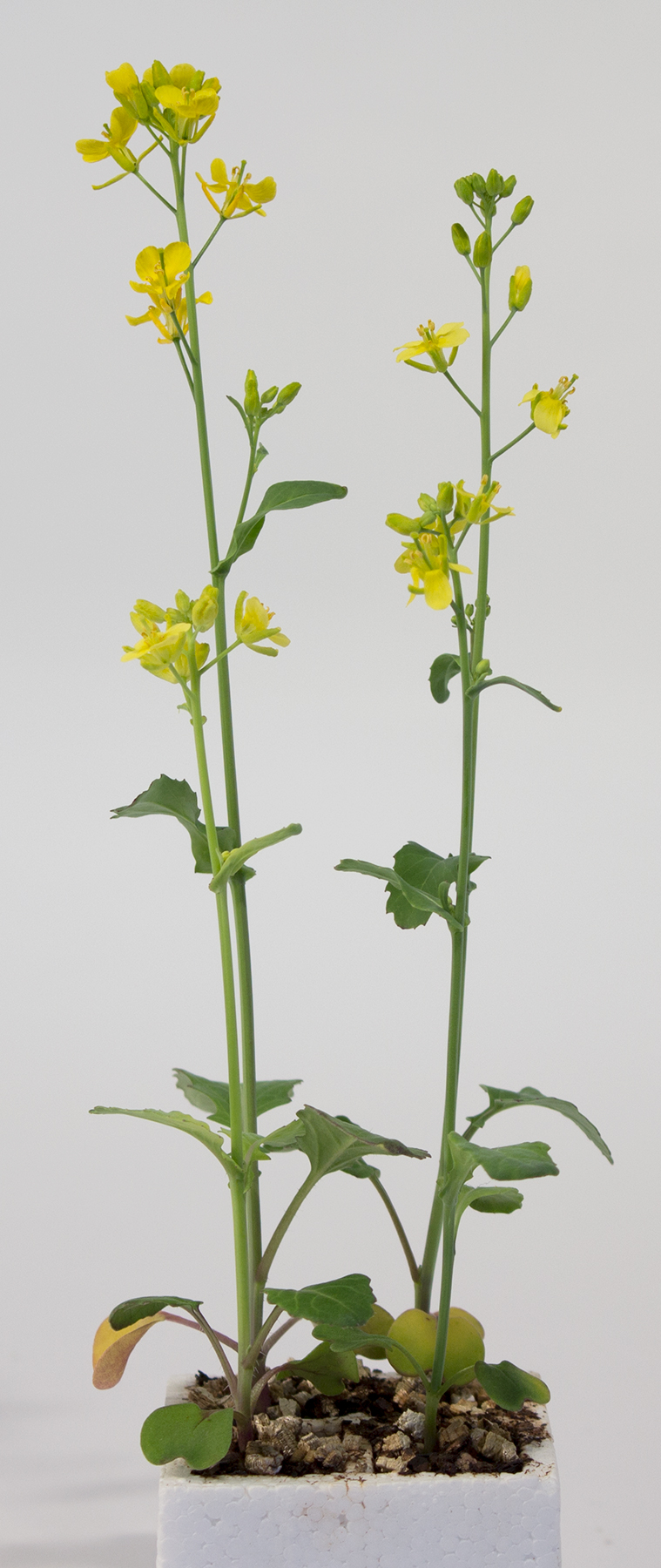
- Subspecies: Brassica rapa subsp. dichotoma

Wisconsin Fast Plants is the registered trademark for a cultivar of Brassica rapa( B.rapa or B.rapa L), developed as a rapid life-cycle model organism for research and teaching. Wisconsin Fast Plants are a member of the Brassicaceae (formerly Cruciferae) family, closely related to the turnip and bok choy. Wisconsin Fast Plants were developed in accordance with an ideotype for an ideal model organism to be used in expediting plant research. Similarly, their rapid life cycle and other model organism characteristics made them easy to grow in large numbers in classrooms. For the last few decades they have been grown in classrooms and laboratories around the world.

== Origin ==
Wisconsin Fast Plants were initially developed as part of a larger breeding project of Rapid-Cycling Brassicas, originating in the early 1970s. Wisconsin Fast Plants and other Rapid-Cycling Brassicas were selected through conventional plant breeding to be a tool that would speed up genetic research for disease resistance in economically important Brassica crops. Through development of Brassica populations with shorter life cycles, many generations of plants could be produced in a short time, relative to ancestral Brassicas. Additionally, Wisconsin Fast Plants were selectively bred to require minimal substrate volume, thrive under fluorescent lighting, and require no dormancy before seeds are able to germinate. These qualities resulted in a model organism with short generation times that allows for growing large sample sizes in the laboratory with minimal space required. These same ideal research qualities resulted in Wisconsin Fast Plants also being particularly well-suited for classroom use, allowing students and teachers to grow multiple generations and conduct experiments with plants indoors during the school year.

Professor Emeritus Paul H. Williams at the University of Wisconsin–Madison is the plant pathologist who originally set forth to produce a model organism that fit his ideotype for improving his research capabilities. Professor Williams obtained over 2000 accessions of Brassica species from the United States Department of Agriculture's National Germplasm System. Growing out these accessions, Williams found a few plants in each species that developed and flowered in a significantly shorter time than the rest. These fast-flowering plants were selected to develop Rapid-Cycling populations of Brassicas. From among these populations emerged Rapid-Cycling Brassica rapa, later dubbed Wisconsin Fast Plants (also known as Fast Plants).

== Selection criteria ==
Wisconsin Fast Plants were produced and continue to be refined for research and education through traditional plant breeding methods, without any modern genetic engineering techniques. Selection focused on multiple traits to develop the ideal model organism, including:

- Short generation (seed-to-seed) time
- High female fertility (abundant seed yield)
- No seed dormancy (able to germinate immediately after harvest)
- Rapid floral/reproductive initiation, without photoperiodism
- Narrow maturation window (all plants flower at the same time)
- Tolerant of growth in high plant density conditions (with minimal competition)
- Ability to thrive with energy derived from continuous, intense artificial illumination in laboratory conditions
- Ability to be grown in small soil volume with simple, reproducible planting media
- Retention of genetic variation within rapid-cycling populations

== Taxonomy ==
The Brassica genus contains substantial morphological variation, both between and within Brassica species and subtaxa. One way in which Brassicas vary is in the time it takes for one generation to grow from seed to seed. Brassicas that have been bred to have a very short generation time are known as Rapid Cycling Brassicas. Rapid Cycling varieties have been bred in several Brassica species, including Brassica rapa, to which Wisconsin Fast Plants belong.

Since the first population of Wisconsin Fast Plants was created through selective breeding, development and continued breeding are ongoing to maintain population viability and genetic diversity. Though Wisconsin Fast Plants were bred from many different accessions of Brassica, their morphology is most reminiscent of their Brassica rapa relative, brown sarson, an oilseed crop from the western Himalayas. Thus, Wisconsin Fast Plants may be scientifically referred to as Brassica rapa ssp. dichotoma.

== Distribution and habitat ==
While many species of Brassica can be found growing wild or in escaped feral populations around the world, Wisconsin Fast Plants were developed to be a model organism growing under indoor conditions and do not typically survive in the wild.

Wisconsin Fast Plants may be tolerant of a range of habitats, but their life cycle may be slower and seed yield may be reduced under non-ideal conditions. The ideal growing conditions for Wisconsin Fast Plants include

- Continuous, uninterrupted, 24/7 lighting of at least 200umol/m2/s
- Temperatures of 65–78 degrees F (18-25C)
- Finely ground, well-aerated planting media with good drainage
- Continuous water availability via wicking system and reservoir
- Available fertilizer via slow-release pellets or liquid application

== Life cycle ==
Wisconsin Fast Plants have an extremely short life cycle. When grown under ideal conditions, plants will flower in 14 days and produce harvestable seed approximately 40 days after planting. The following Fast Plants life stage descriptions align with plants grown in ideal conditions. Wisconsin Fast Plants grown in less-than-ideal conditions typically grow and develop at slower rates.

=== Days 1–2 ===
After planting and watering, the seed germinates. During germination, the seed imbibes water and swells until its seed coat cracks. The root radicle is the first part to emerge from the seed.

=== Day 3 ===
The hypocotyl (seed stem) pushes through the soil surface, pulling the cotyledons (seed leaves) along with it. No longer needed, the protective seed coat drops from the cotyledons to the soil. Chlorophyll and purple anthocyanin pigments may be observed as soon as the seedling has emerged.

=== Day 4 ===
Above ground, the hypocotyl elongates as the plant reaches upward for light. Underground, the roots grow downward and anchor the seedling in the soil.

=== Days 5–8 ===
Above ground, the stem elongates, and true leaves grow from a point at the very top of the plant, called the apical (shoot) meristem. Underground, roots develop root hairs, increasing root surface area and aiding in absorption of water and nutrients from the surrounding planting media.

=== Days 9–13 ===
The plant begins to shift to reproduction, halting stem and leaf growth and beginning flower development. Flower buds grow from the apical (shoot) meristem.

=== Days 14–17 ===
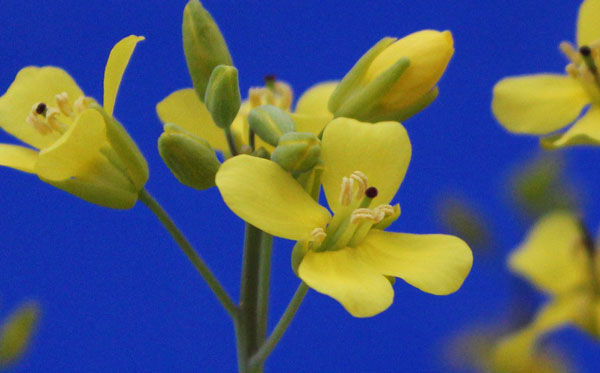
Standard Wisconsin Fast Plants purple-stigma flowers

Flowers bloom. Stamens release pollen from anthers and pistils become pollen receptive at the stigma tip. If pollen is transferred flower-to-flower, pollination occurs. Pollen that lands on the stigma of another flower's pistil grows a tube down into the pistil, where the eggs are housed. Sperm (from inside the pollen grains) then move down the tube until they reach the eggs and fertilization occurs. Fast Plants are self-incompatible; therefore, a successful fertilization requires pollen transfer between two individual plants.

=== Days 18–20 ===
Fertilized eggs inside the flowers’ pistils grow and develop to become the embryos of new seeds. The outside of the pistil swells and becomes the seed pod (fruit) that encases several seeds.

=== Days 21–40 ===
Flower petals slowly wilt and fall off while embryos mature within the seed pods. Twenty days after the final pollination, plants are removed from water, allowed to dry, and seed ripening begins. When plants are brown, dry, and brittle, seeds can be harvested and stored or planted. Inside each seed is a tiny embryo, waiting for water and warmth so it can germinate into a new plant, beginning the life cycle anew.

== Uses ==
Owing to their short life cycle, widely-available growth requirements, and responsiveness to environmental variables, Wisconsin Fast Plants and other Rapid-Cycling Brassicas have a long list of uses in education and research applications.

=== Primary, secondary, and higher education ===
Outreach education associated with Wisconsin Fast Plants was established at the University of Wisconsin–Madison through a variety of grant-funded projects when this model organism showed educational promise. The Wisconsin Fast Plants Program continues to this day, developing in collaboration with educators at all levels and making available as Open Education Resources online a variety of lesson plans, experimental protocols, DIY light construction and growing system plans, and more. The mission of the Wisconsin Fast Plants Program is to support researchers and educators at all levels in teaching and learning with Wisconsin Fast Plants as a model organism. Resources developed by the Wisconsin Fast Plants Program and made available on their website are offered under the Creative Commons Attribution-ShareAlike Public License.

Wisconsin Fast Plants have been and continue to be used as a model organism to teach life cycles, anatomy, reproduction, quantitative and Mendelian genetics, molecular biology, plant breeding, pollination biology, ecology, agronomy, and much more. In addition, Wisconsin Fast Plants are frequently used by students conducting independent investigations for events such as the Science Olympiad.

=== Research applications ===
Wisconsin Fast Plants enable researchers to grow large populations of plants quickly in a relatively small space and without need for a greenhouse. As a result, Wisconsin Fast Plants are frequently used as a model organism in a wide variety of investigations. To demonstrate the breadth of this usage, in May 2022 a Google Scholar search for “Wisconsin Fast Plants” generated 993 results, and a search for “Rapid cycling Brassica rapa” found 750 scholarly articles. Topics in these publications range from educational research to investigations about phenomena such as drought tolerance pollen germination, pollinator behavior, pollinator efficacy, genetic transformation techniques, phytoremediation of soils, disease resistance, efficacy of student learning and analysis of observed variation, population dynamics, regeneration from plant tissues, and many others.

In addition to scientific research conducted in a typical laboratory, Wisconsin Fast Plants have been used in plant research conducted in space. Most notably, aboard the Mir Space Station in 1997, Wisconsin Fast Plants were the first seeds to be germinated in space from plants that were themselves grown, pollinated, and harvested in space.
