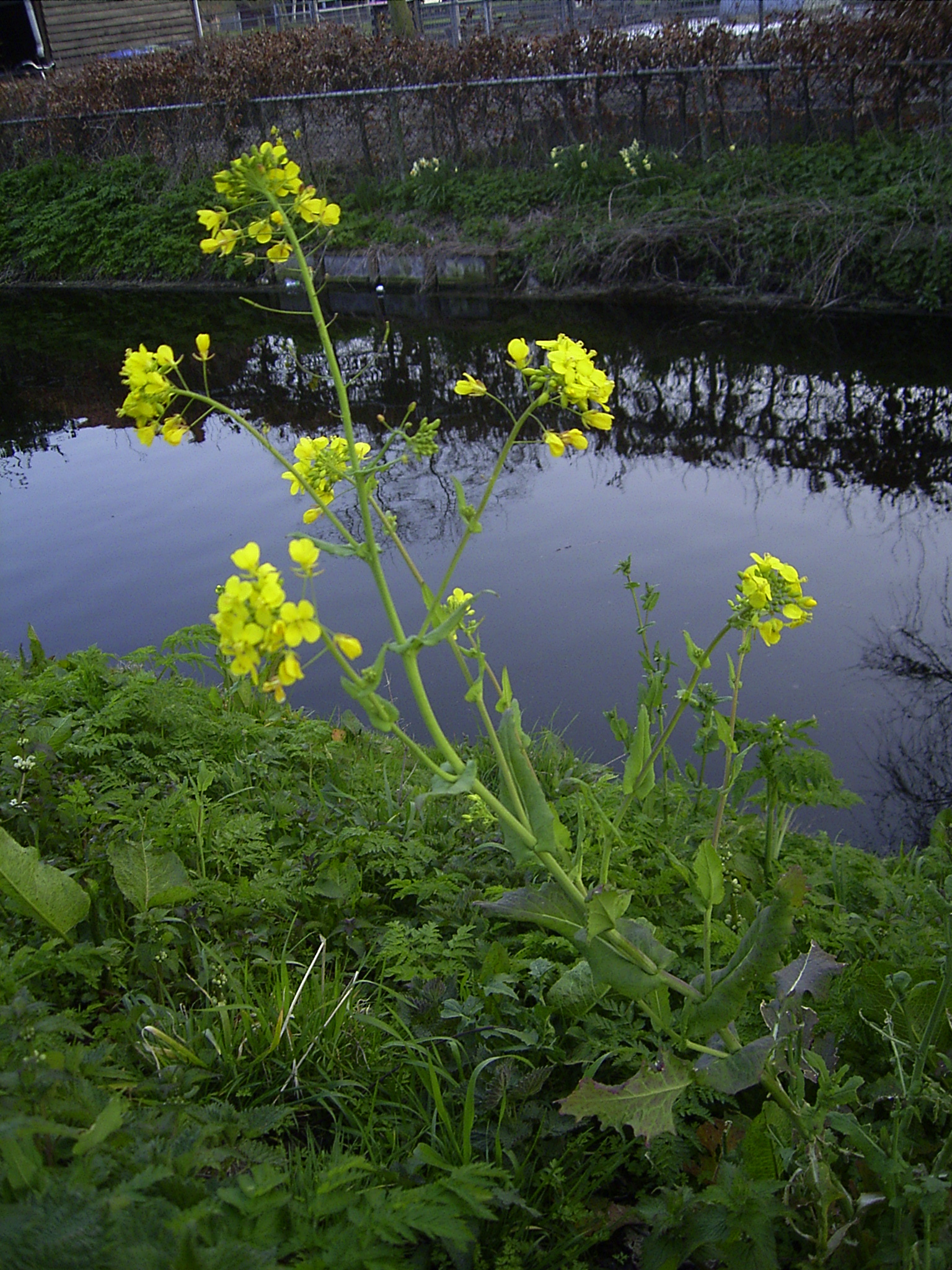
- A brassica rapa plant in The Hague, Netherlands

Scientific classification
- Kingdom: Plantae
- Clade: Embryophytes
- Clade: Tracheophytes
- Clade: Angiosperms
- Clade: Eudicots
- Clade: Rosids
- Order: Brassicales
- Family: Brassicaceae
- Genus: Brassica
- Species: B. rapa

Binomial name
- Brassica rapa L.

= Brassica rapa =

Species of flowering plant

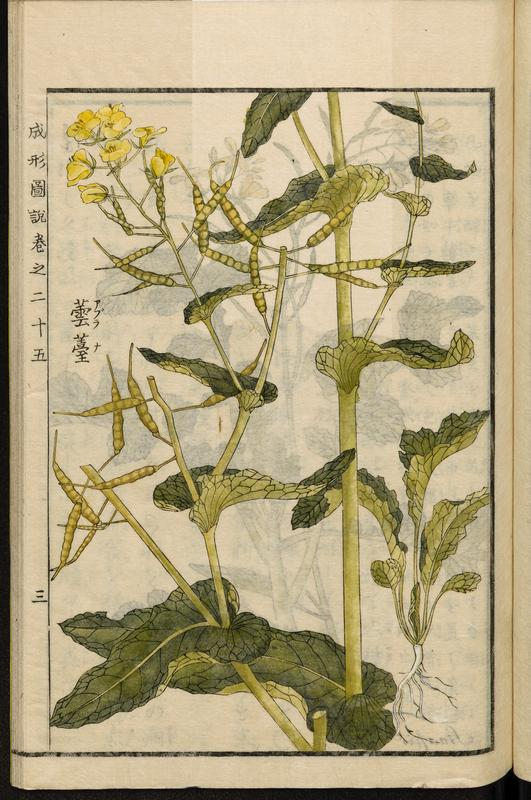
Illustration of Brassica rapa from the Japanese agricultural encyclopedia Seikei Zusetsu.

Brassica rapa is an annual to biennial plant species native to Eurasia that is from the Brassicaceae family. The B. rapa subspecies oleifera is an oilseed commonly known as turnip rape, field mustard, bird's rape, and keblock.

It has been widely cultivated into many forms, including the turnip (a root vegetable), komatsuna, Chinese cabbage, bomdong, pak choi / bok choy, and rapini. Its domesticated forms include turnips and leafy greens, such as bok choy and napa cabbage. The oilseed types are grown for food and industrial uses. Genetic studies indicate that B. rapa was one of the earliest domesticated brassicas, with turnip-like forms arising first and additional morphotypes developing independently across Eurasia. Wild, feral, and cultivated populations are found worldwide, making the species important agriculturally, economically, and ecologically.

Rapeseed oil is a general term for oil from some Brassica species. Food grade oil made from the seed of low-erucic acid Canadian-developed strains is also called canola oil, while non-food oil is called colza oil. Canola oil can be sourced from Brassica rapa and Brassica napus, which are commonly grown in Canada, and Brassica juncea, which is less common.

== History ==
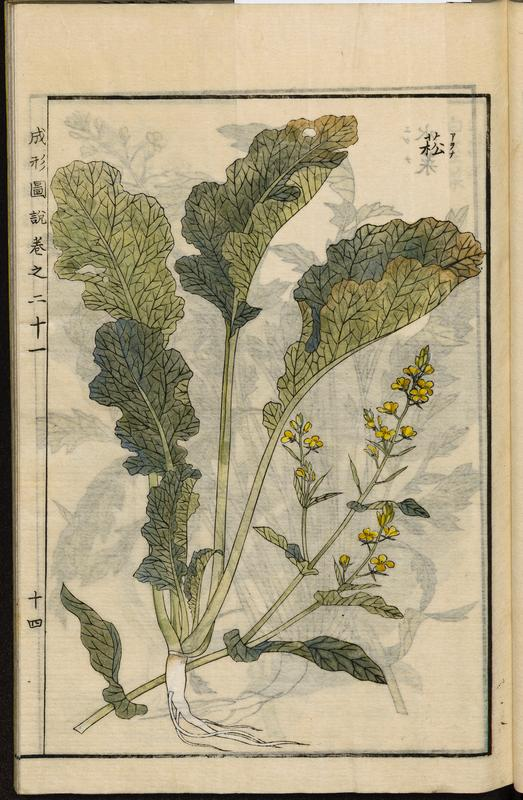
Illustration of Brassica rapa from the Japanese agricultural encyclopedia Seikei Zusetsu.

The geographic and genetic origins of B. rapa have been difficult to identify due to its long history of human cultivation, as well as difficulty finding Brassica seeds at archaeological sites. It is found in most parts of the world, and has returned to the wild many times as a feral plant or weed. Recent genomic studies show that many “wild” populations found in Europe and the Americas are actually feral descendants of cultivated plants, while actual wild populations appear to be from regions such as the Caucasus and Central Asia.

Genetic sequencing and environmental modeling have indicated that ancestral B. rapa likely originated 4000 to 6000 years ago in the Hindu Kush area of Central Asia, and had three sets of chromosomes, providing the genetic potential for a diversity of form, flavor, and growth. Domestication has produced modern vegetables and oil-seed crops, all with two sets of chromosomes.

Oilseed subspecies (subsp. oleifera) of Brassica rapa may have been domesticated several times from the Mediterranean to India, starting as early as 2000 BC. There are descriptions of B. rapa vegetables in Indian and Chinese documents from around 1000 BC.

Edible turnips were possibly first cultivated in northern Europe, and were an important food in ancient Rome. The turnip then spread east to China, and reached Japan by 700 AD.

In the 18th century, the turnip and the oilseed-producing variants were thought to be different species by Carl Linnaeus, who named them B. rapa and B. campestris. Twentieth-century taxonomists found that the plants were cross fertile and belonged to the same species. Since the turnip had been named first by Linnaeus, the name Brassica rapa was assigned to the plant in his work Species Plantarum.

== Biology ==
Brassica rapa is an annual to biennial member of the mustard family. The wild and weedy forms typically have a slender taproot and a leafy rosette, whereas turnip forms form a swollen storage root. The stems are often upright and branched, and they usually grow to around 0.5–1.3 meters in height. The lower leaves are stalked and toothed or lobed, while the upper leaves are narrower. Most flowers have four yellow petals and, after flowering, they develop into narrow seed pods. Many forms of Brassica rapa can be differentiated by the presence of hairs on the stem and the type of fruit pod.

B. rapa can behave as a summer annual, winter annual, or biannual depending on the climate and management. It can grow in a wide variety of environments and soil types, and it is also common as an escaped plant. The species reproduces by seed. The mature seed pods can break open and release viable seeds into the surrounding area, which creates seed banks that germinate quickly (~1-3 days) in ideal soil temperatures. Like other brassicas, B. rapa contains secondary metabolites like glucosinolates, which can influence the germination of neighboring plants and deter herbivores. The flowers supply plentiful pollen and nectar and are visited by a variety of insects, including bees and flies, which act as pollinators.

Brassica rapa is a diploid with a base chromosome number of 10. The estimated genome size is approximately 425 million base pairs. A near complete genome assembly of B. rapa was published in 2023 (Chiifu v4.0), with eight out of ten chromosomes assembled telomere-to-telomere with only two gaps.

== Adaptation ==
Brassica rapa is an extremely adaptable plant. It prefers moist soil that is well-drained at around 45-85°F, but it can also grow in heavy clay soils. It tolerates a broad pH range from 4.8 to 8.5. Although it grows best in full sun, it can also succeed in moderate shade. If light and temperature conditions are not ideal, B. rapa seeds can delay germination until conditions are favorable.

== Uses ==
Cultivated varieties of B. rapa are consumed commonly as vegetables, such as turnip roots, napa cabbage, komatsuna, pak choi, and other leafy greens, particularly in East Asian, South Asian, and Mediterranean cuisines. The young leaves are a leaf vegetable eaten raw, while older leaves are typically cooked. The taproot and seeds can also be eaten raw, although the seeds contain an oil that can cause irritation for some people. Rapeseed oil from the plant is also used to make canola and colza oils.

B. rapa is also commonly used as a rotational cover crop for vegetables due to its ability to prevent erosion and deter disease. Because of their fast life-cycle and genetic diversity, the B. rapa cultivar Wisconsin Fast Plants is widely used in genetics and plant biology education.

== Ecology and pollination ==
Brassica rapa is an early-season nectar and pollen source for a wide range of insects. Numerous pollinators are attracted to its bright yellow flowers, including bees, flies, and butterflies. A common visitor, the small white butterfly (Pieris rapae) uses the plant both as a nectar source and as a host for larval feeding. Conversely, insect pollination is also very important to the plant; insect pollination of B. rapa leads to 30% more yield when compared to self-fertilizing controls. Furthermore, B. rapa can undergo rapid genomic adaptations when selected on by bumblebees.

== Cultivars ==
Cultivar	Image	Name
Bok choy		Brassica rapa subsp. chinensis
Bomdong		Brassica rapa var. glabra
Choy sum		Brassica rapa subsp. parachinensis
Field mustard		Brassica rapa subsp. oleifera
Komatsuna		Brassica rapa subsp. perviridis
Mizuna		Brassica rapa var. nipposinica
Napa cabbage		Brassica rapa subsp. pekinensis
Rapini		Brassica rapa var. ruvo
Tatsoi		Brassica rapa subsp. narinosa
Turnip		Brassica rapa subsp. rapa
Yellow sarson		Brassica rapa subsp. trilocularis
