= Chinese cabbage =

Vegetable of the bok choy plant

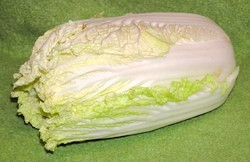
- Brassica rapa, subsp. pekinensis
- Species: Brassica rapa
- Cultivar group: Chinensis Group, Pekinensis Group
- Origin: China, before the 15th century
- Cultivar group members: Many; see text

Chinese cabbage (Brassica rapa, subspecies pekinensis and chinensis) is either of two cultivar groups of leaf vegetables often used in Chinese cuisine: the Pekinensis Group (napa cabbage) and the Chinensis Group (bok choy).

These vegetables are both variant cultivars or subspecies of B. rapa and belong to the same genus as Brassica oleracea, whose cultivars include Western staples, such as cabbage, broccoli, and cauliflower. Both B. rapa cultivars have many variations in name, spelling, and scientific classification, especially bok choy cultivars.

== History ==
The Chinese cabbage was principally grown in the Yangtze River Delta region, but the Ming dynasty naturalist Li Shizhen popularized it by bringing attention to its medicinal qualities. The variant cultivated in Zhejiang around the 14th century was brought north, and the northern harvest of napa cabbage soon exceeded the southern one. These were then exported back south along the Grand Canal to Hangzhou and traded by sea as far south as Guangdong.

Napa cabbage became a staple in Northeastern Chinese cuisine for making suan cai, Chinese sauerkraut. In Korea, napa cabbage was used for baek-kimchi, which developed into kimchi. Chinese cabbage is now commonly found in markets throughout the world, catering both to the Chinese diaspora and to northern markets that appreciate its resistance to cold.

In 2017, aboard the International Space Station, a crop of Chinese cabbage from a plant growth device included an allotment for crew consumption, while the rest was saved for scientific study.

== Cultivar groups ==
There are two distinct groups of Brassica rapa used as leaf vegetables in China, and a wide range of cultivars within these two groups. The binomial name B. campestris is also used.

=== Pekinensis Group ===
This group is the more common of the two, especially outside Asia; names such as napa cabbage, dà báicài (Chinese: 大白菜, "large white vegetable"); Baguio petsay or petsay wombok (Tagalog); Chinese white cabbage; "wong a pak" (Hokkien, Fujianese); baechu (Korean: 배추), wongbok; hakusai (Japanese: 白菜 or ハクサイ) and "suann-tang-pe̍h-á" (Taiwanese) usually refer to members of this group. Pekinensis Group cabbages have broad green leaves with white petioles, tightly wrapped in a cylindrical formation and usually forming a compact head. As the group name indicates, this is particularly popular in northern China around Beijing (Peking).

=== Chinensis Group ===
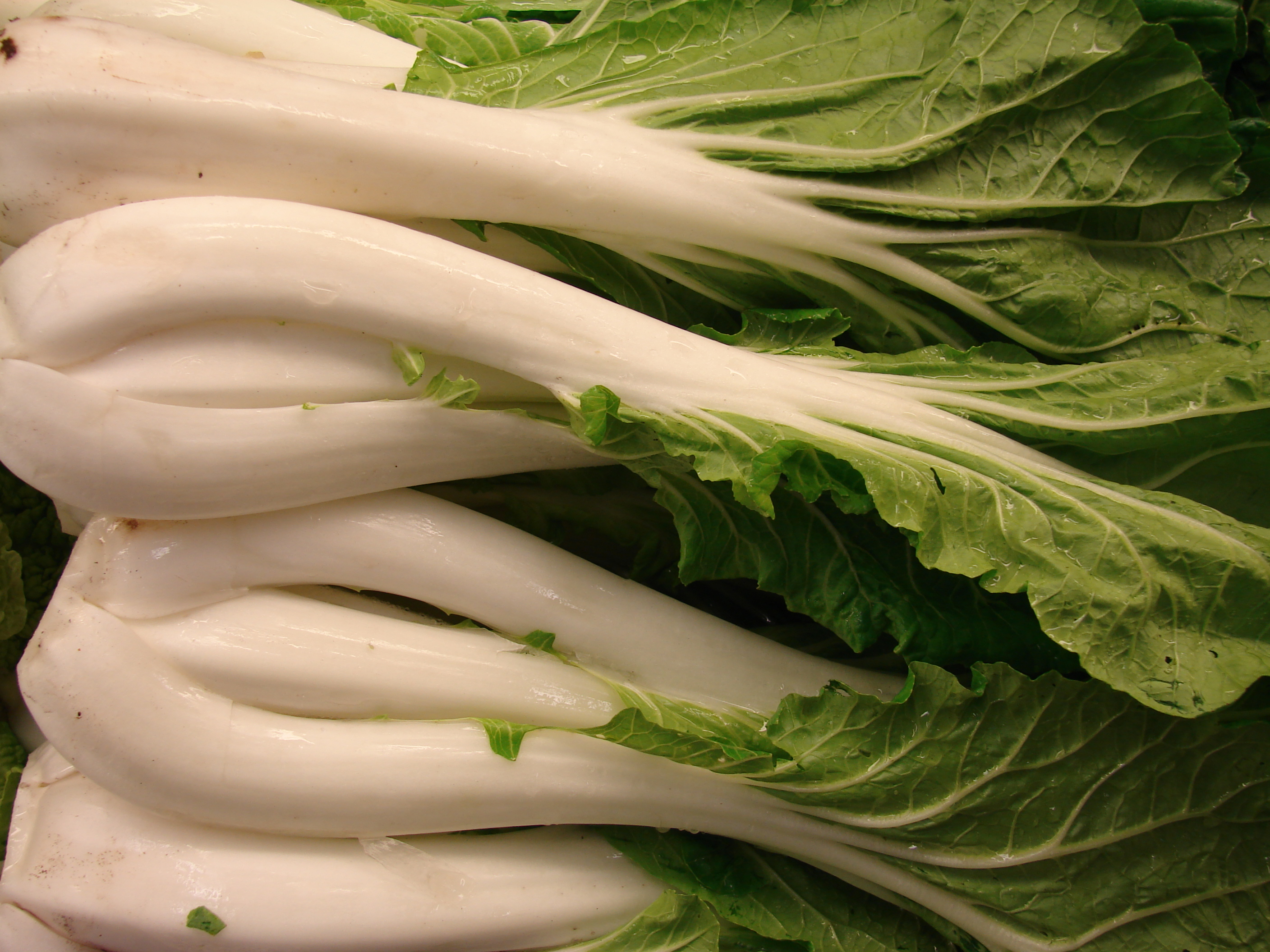
Bok choy

Chinensis Group cultivars do not form heads; instead, they have smooth, dark green leaf blades forming a cluster reminiscent of mustard or celery. These cultivars are popular in southern China and Southeast Asia. Being winter-hardy, they are increasingly grown in Northern Europe. This group was originally classified as its own species under the name B. chinensis by Linnaeus.

== See also ==
- Gai lan (芥兰, p jièlán), the Chinese vegetable B. oleracea Alboglabra Group
- Choy sum (菜心, p càixīn) aka yu choy (油菜, p yóucài), the Chinese vegetable B. rapa var. parachinensis
- Turnip, the same species B. rapa cultivated in Europe for its roots
