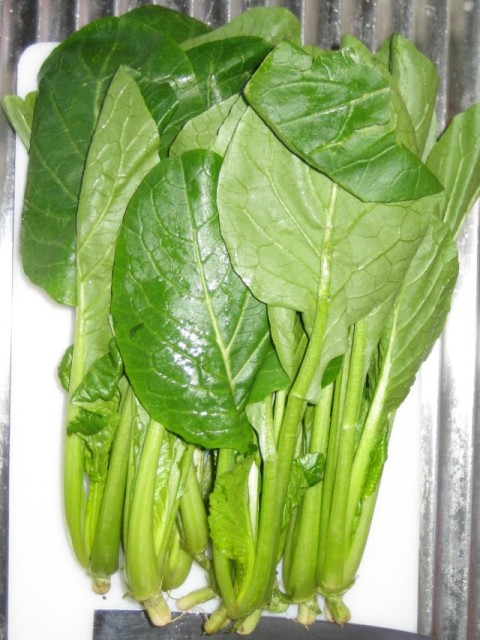

Scientific classification
- Kingdom: Plantae
- Clade: Tracheophytes
- Clade: Angiosperms
- Clade: Eudicots
- Clade: Rosids
- Order: Brassicales
- Family: Brassicaceae
- Genus: Brassica
- Species: B. rapa
- Variety: B. r. var. perviridis

Trinomial name
- Brassica rapa var. perviridis

= Komatsuna =

Variety of leaf vegetable

Komatsuna (小松菜(コマツナ)) or Japanese mustard spinach (Brassica rapa var. perviridis) is a leaf vegetable. It is a variety of Brassica rapa, the plant species that yields the turnip, mizuna, napa cabbage, and rapini. It is grown commercially in Japan and Taiwan. It is a versatile vegetable that is cooked and eaten in many ways. The plant is also used for fodder in some Asian countries.

The leaves of komatsuna may be eaten at any stage of their growth. In a mature plant they are dark green with slender light green stalks, around 30 centimeters (12 in) long and 18 cm (7.1 in) wide. It is most often grown in the spring and autumn, as it cannot endure extreme heat or cold for more than a short time. However, nowadays it is grown year-round in greenhouses.

== History ==
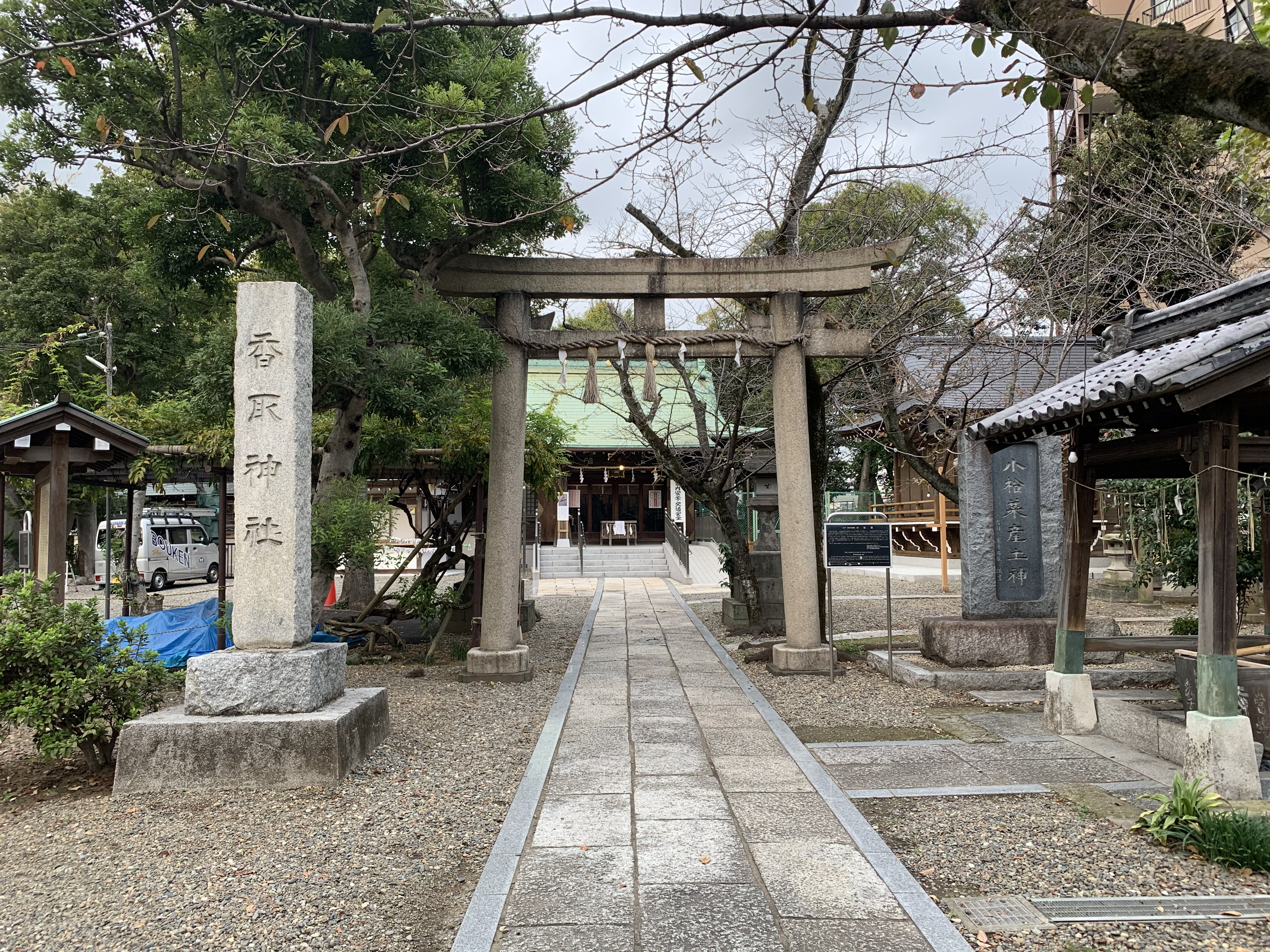
Katori Shrine of Shin-Koiwa

The name komatsuna means 'greens of Komatsu' in Japanese, a reference to the village of Komatsugawa in Edogawa, Tokyo, where it was heavily grown during the Edo period. It was named by Tokugawa Yoshimune, the eighth shogun, who visited Edogawa in 1719 for hunting and stopped at the local Katori Shrine for lunch. The shrine priest served him soup with a rice cake and a local leaf vegetable. The shogun was impressed by the flavor of the vegetable so much and named it komatsuna, after the nearby Komatsu River (which gives the village its name). Till this day, the Shin-Koiwa Katori Shrine offers komatsuna to the deities on New Year's Eve. People who come to the shrine to pray on New Year's Day are also given komatsuna for good luck in the new year.

Since the days of the shogun, komatsuna has been bred to have a sweeter taste. The old variety thought to have been served to the shogun is not widely available. That variety is called Goseki bansei. It grows faster and has bigger but fewer leaves than ordinary komatsuna, and a strong, spicy flavor.

== Cooking ==
Mustard spinach, raw
Nutritional value per 100 g (3.5 oz)
- Energy: 92 kJ (22 kcal)
- Carbohydrates: 3.9 g
- Dietary fiber: 2.8 g
- Fat: 0.3 g
- Protein: 2.2 g
Vitamins and minerals
Vitamins	Quantity %DV^{†}
Vitamin A equiv.	55% 495 μg
Thiamine (B1)	6% 0.068 mg
Riboflavin (B2)	7% 0.093 mg
Niacin (B3)	4% 0.678 mg
Pantothenic acid (B5)	4% 0.178 mg
Vitamin B6	9% 0.153 mg
Folate (B9)	40% 159 μg
Vitamin C	144% 130 mg
Minerals	Quantity %DV^{†}
Calcium	16% 210 mg
Iron	8% 1.5 mg
Magnesium	3% 11 mg
Manganese	18% 0.407 mg
Phosphorus	2% 28 mg
Potassium	15% 449 mg
Sodium	1% 21 mg
Zinc	2% 0.17 mg
- Link to USDA Database entry
- ^{†}Percentages estimated using US recommendations for adults, except for potassium, which is estimated based on expert recommendation from the National Academies.

Komatsuna has a fresh, sweet taste and a crunchy texture. It is a very versatile vegetable and can be eaten raw, pickled, stir-fried, boiled, used fresh in salads, or added to soups. It is popular in soups as it can stay firm after being simmered. It is an excellent source of calcium, vitamin A, and vitamin C.

== See also ==
- Brassica juncea
