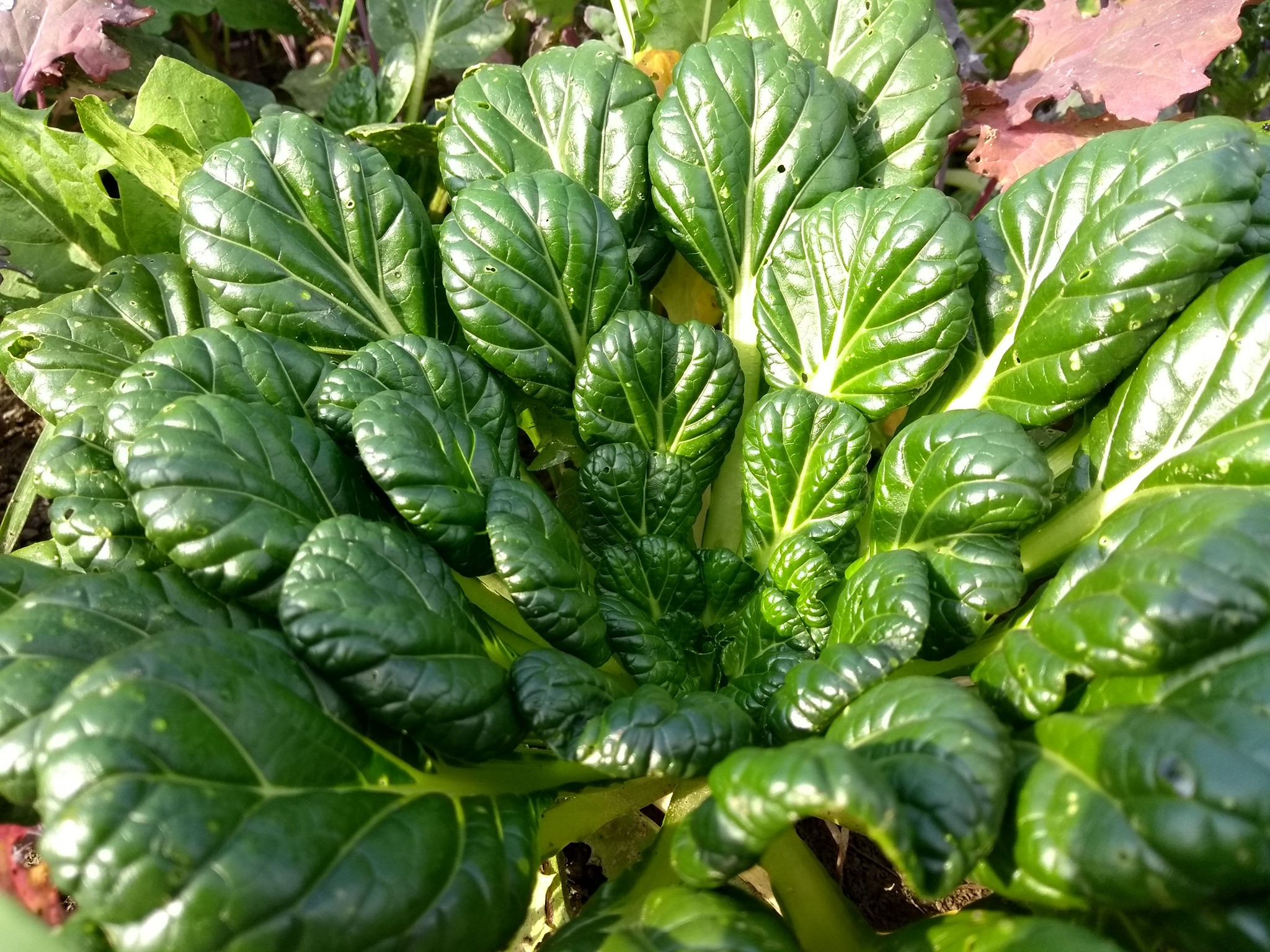

Scientific classification
- Kingdom: Plantae
- Clade: Tracheophytes
- Clade: Angiosperms
- Clade: Eudicots
- Clade: Rosids
- Order: Brassicales
- Family: Brassicaceae
- Genus: Brassica
- Species: B. rapa
- Subspecies: B. r. subsp. narinosa

Trinomial name
- Brassica rapa subsp. narinosa (L.H.Bailey) Hanelt

= Tatsoi =

Variety of Brassica rapa

Tatsoi
- Chinese: 塌菜
- Literal meaning: drooping vegetable
Transcriptions
Standard Mandarin
- Hanyu Pinyin: tācài
- IPA: [tʰá.tsʰâɪ]
Yue: Cantonese
- Jyutping: taap3 coi3
- IPA: [tʰāːp.tsʰɔ̄ːy]

Wu Chinese name
- Chinese: 塌棵菜
Transcriptions
Standard Mandarin
- Hanyu Pinyin: tākēcài
Wu
- Romanization: thaq-khu-tshe
Yue: Cantonese
- Jyutping: taap3 fo2 coi3

Yangtze Mandarin Chinese name
- Traditional Chinese: 烏塌菜
- Simplified Chinese: 乌塌菜
- Literal meaning: dark drooping vegetable
Transcriptions
Standard Mandarin
- Hanyu Pinyin: wūtācài
Wu
- Romanization: wu-thaq-tshe

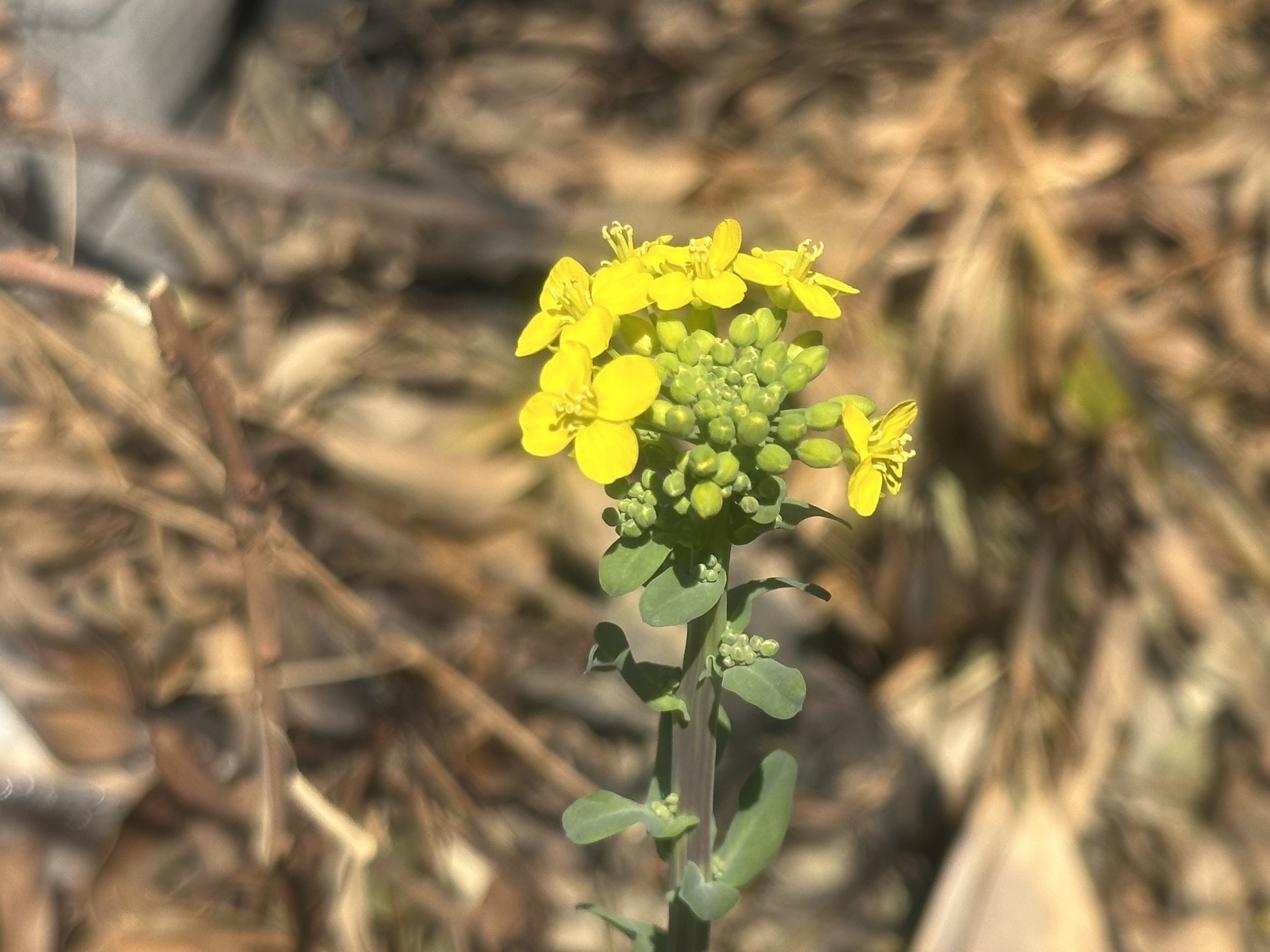
Blooming tatsoi

Tatsoi or tat soi (Brassica rapa subsp. narinosa or Brassica rapa var. rosularis) is an Asian variety of Brassica rapa grown for greens. Also called tat choy, it is closely related to the more familiar bok choy. This plant has become popular in North American cuisine as well and is now grown throughout the world.

== Naming ==
The name comes from Cantonese taap3 coi3 ('drooping vegetable'), often rendered tat soi or tat choy. However, its natural habitat is not where Cantonese is spoken but alongside the Yangtze River, where it is called thaq-khu-tshe (塌棵菜) or wūtācài (乌塌菜, 'dark drooping veggie'). Mandarin borrowed the former name as tākēcài. It is also called "Chinese flat cabbage", "rosette bok choy", "broadbeaked mustard", "spoon mustard", or "spinach mustard".

== Description ==
The plant has dark green spoon-shaped leaves which form a thick rosette. It has a soft creamy texture and a subtle yet distinctive flavour.

=== Planting ===
It can be grown to harvestable size in 45–50 days, and can withstand temperatures down to –10 °C (15 °F). Tatsoi can even be harvested from under snow.

- Days to Maturity: 45
- When to Sow
  - Outside: As early as the soil can be worked. Sow again in late summer or fall.
  - Inside: Sow directly outdoors.
- Seed Depth: 1/4" to 1/2"
- Seed Spacing: 6"
- Row Spacing: 18"
- Days to Emerge: 5 - 15
- Thinning: When 4" tall, thin to 6" apart.

== Nutritional value ==
Tatsoi contains high levels of vitamin C, carotenoids, folic acid, calcium and potassium.

== Cooking ==
Tatsoi is used for pesto, salads, stir fry, and garnishing soup. According to Food52, "Tatsoi is a very versatile green, equally suited to being served raw or lightly cooked. To make it easy, just use tatsoi anywhere you’d use spinach. Lightly steam or sauté it, wilt the leaves with a warm dressing, or add them to a soup at the end of cooking."

The leaves are similar to romaine, while the stalks taste a little like cucumber, with a mild bitterness. The leaves and inner stalk are tender; the outer stalk is typically discarded. Typical cooking is to stir-fry the leaves and the stalks. They also can be pickled.
