= Mizuna =

Edible plant of the cabbage family

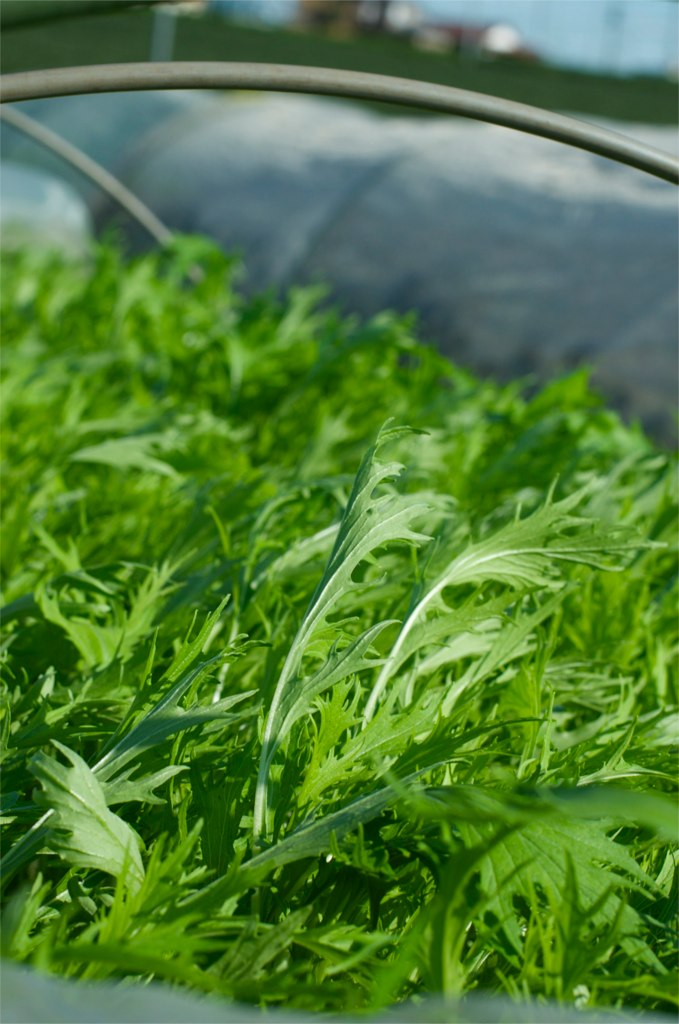
- Mizuna
- Species: Brassica rapa var. nipposinica
- Cultivar: Mizuna

Mizuna (ミズナ(水菜), "water greens"), kyouna (京菜), Japanese mustard greens, or spider mustard is a cultivar of Brassica rapa var. niposinica.

== Description and use ==
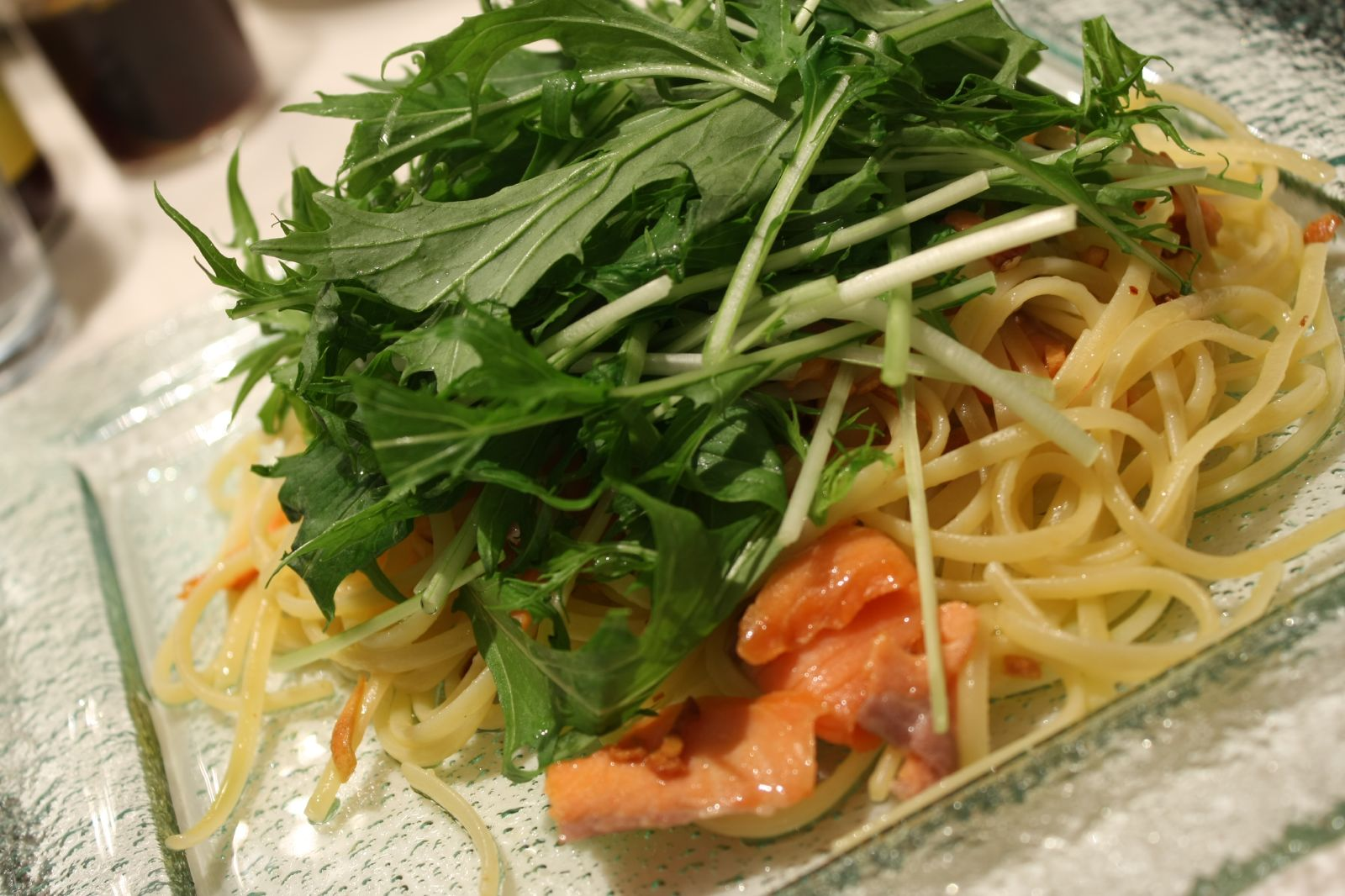
Mizuna atop pasta and smoked salmon

Mizuna has dark green, serrated leaves, and is described as having, when raw, a "piquant, mild peppery flavor...slightly spicy, but less so than arugula." Mizuna is often eaten as a raw green in salads, either alone or mixed with other leafy, spring-like greens. Mizuna is also sometimes prepared cooked, such as in stir-fries, soups, and nabemono (Japanese hot pot). It is also used as a garnish.

At least a couple of varieties of mizuna have significant anthocyanin content, causing them to have pinkish to dark purple stems and/or leaves.

== History ==
Mizuna is one of the oldest vegetables cultivated in Kyoto and has been described in old Japanese literature. Kyoto was the capital of Japan from 794 to 1868. During that time, many varieties of vegetables were grown and presented as offerings to the emperor. Consequently, in the Kyoto region, there are several traditional vegetables known as Kyo-yasai (Kyo and yasai mean Kyoto and vegetables, respectively). Several types of Kyo-yasai are still being actively cultivated, including varieties of turnip (Brassica rapa L.), radish (Raphanus sativus L.), eggplant (Solanum melongena L.), pumpkin (Cucurbita moschata Duch.), and various other leafy vegetables.

Among the types of Kyo-yasai, Mizuna (B. rapa L. subsp. nipposinica) was aparticularly popular leafy vegetables. Mizuna was used to be eaten boiled in the past; in modern times, it is often used in salads.

In ancient literature mentioning Mizuna, the earliest reference that contains a picture of a Mizuna is Koukasyunju, an agricultural book published in 1707. Mizuna depicted in this book had almost the same form as that of the present-day Mizuna.

== Varieties ==
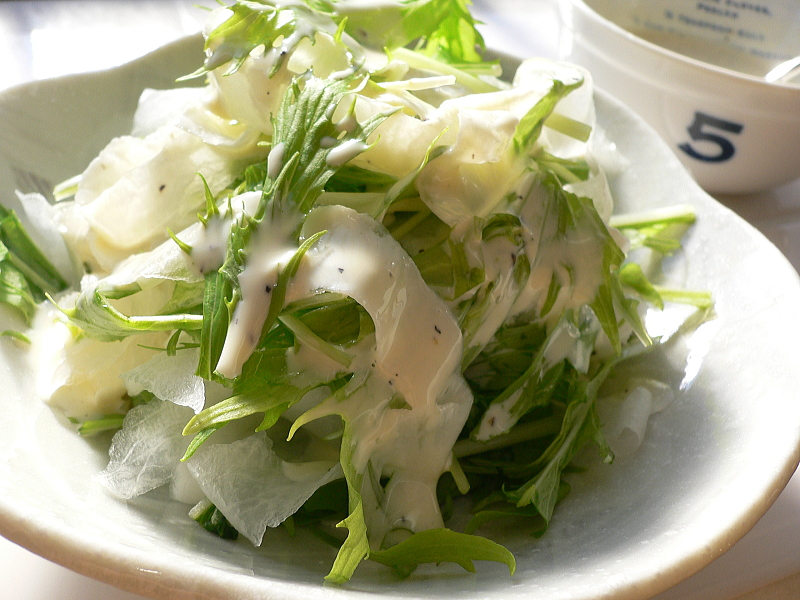
A salad of mizuna and daikon

In addition to the term mizuna (and its alternates) being applied to at least two different species of Brassica, horticulturalists have defined and named a number of varieties. For example, a resource provided by Cornell University and the United States Department of Agriculture lists sixteen varieties including "Early Mizuna", "Kyona Mizuna", "Komatsuna Mizuna", "Vitamin Green Mizuna", "Kyoto Mizuna", "Happy Rich Mizuna", "Summer Fest Mizuna", "Tokyo Early Mizuna", "Mibuna Mizuna", "Red Komatsuna Mizuna", "Waido Mizuna" and "Purple Mizuna". "Benigoromo" and "Pinky Pop" varieties with anthocyanins also exist.

== Cultivation ==
Mizuna has been cultivated in Japan since ancient times. Mizuna was successfully grown in the International Space Station in 2019. It grows in hardiness zones 4 to 9. Mizuna prefers full sun or partial shade, well-drained soil and a pH of 6.5–7.0. It can be grown as a microgreen, sowing every 3 cm, or for its leaves, with 20 cm spacing.

Mizuna is best sown directly into the garden. While the ideal germination temperature is 55° to 75°F, the seeds will germinate in temperatures as low as 40°F. Mizuna is both tolerant of light frosts and very slow to bolt, making it an ideal vegetable for early spring or fall planting. While tolerant of partial shade, it will grow best in full sun, which means at least 6 hours of sun per day. Supplemental irrigation should be provided if rainfall is not plentiful.

Mizuna may be harvested at any stage, from baby greens through full maturity. Harvest the entire plant by cutting it off near the ground. Alternatively, use the cut-and-come-again method by cutting the greens 2 inches or more above the ground.

It is produced by more than 30 countries around the world, but China, Japan, South Korea, India and the United States together account for 70% of global production.
