= Napa cabbage =

Subspecies of flowering plant

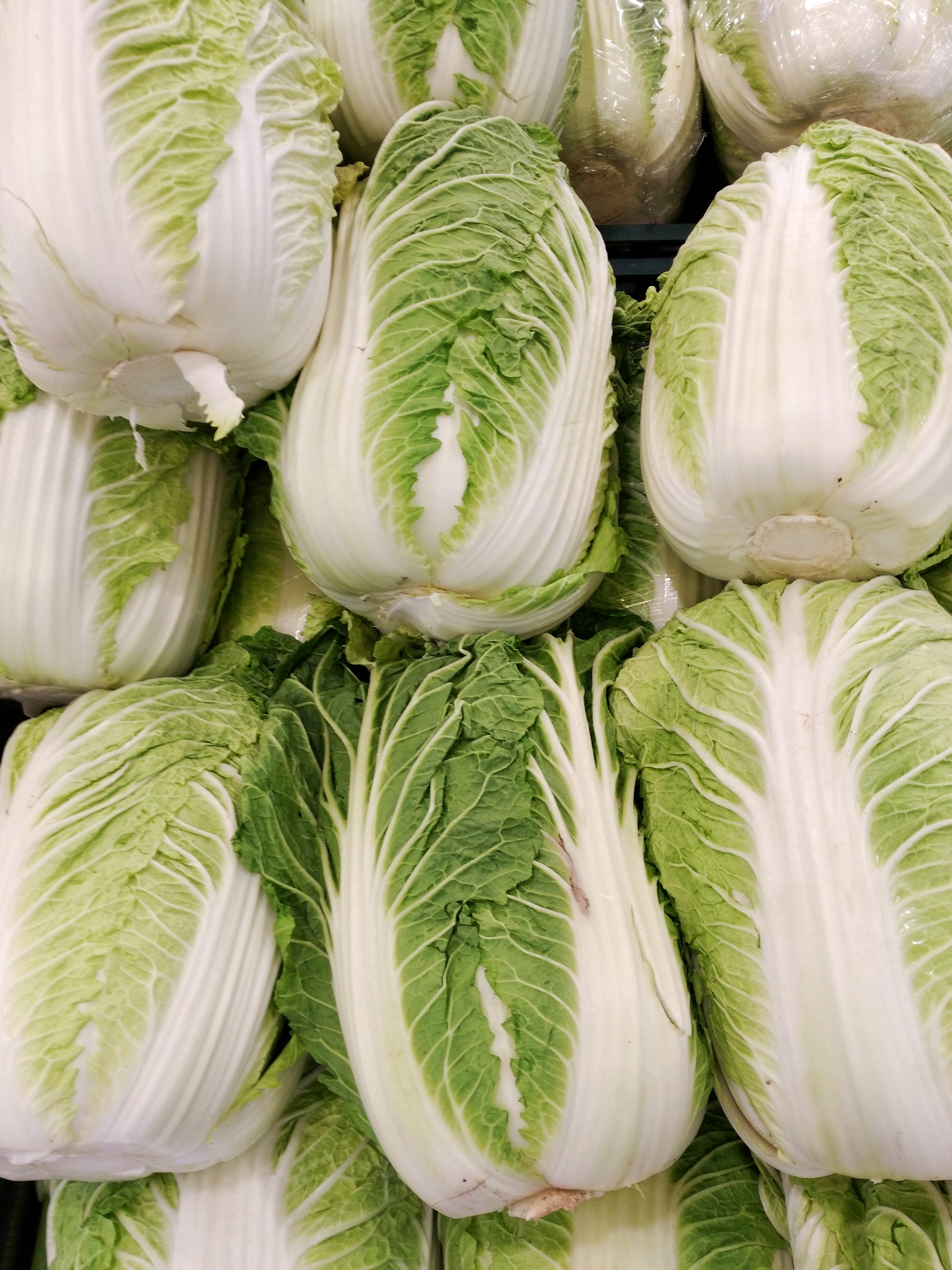
- Species: Brassica rapa
- Cultivar group: Pekinensis Group
- Origin: China, before the 15th century

Napa cabbage (Brassica rapa subsp. pekinensis, or Brassica rapa Pekinensis Group) is a type of Chinese cabbage originating near the Beijing region of China that is widely used in East Asian cuisine. Since the 20th century, it has also become a widespread crop in Europe, the Americas, and Australia. In much of the world, it is referred to as "Chinese cabbage".

== Names ==
Regional names
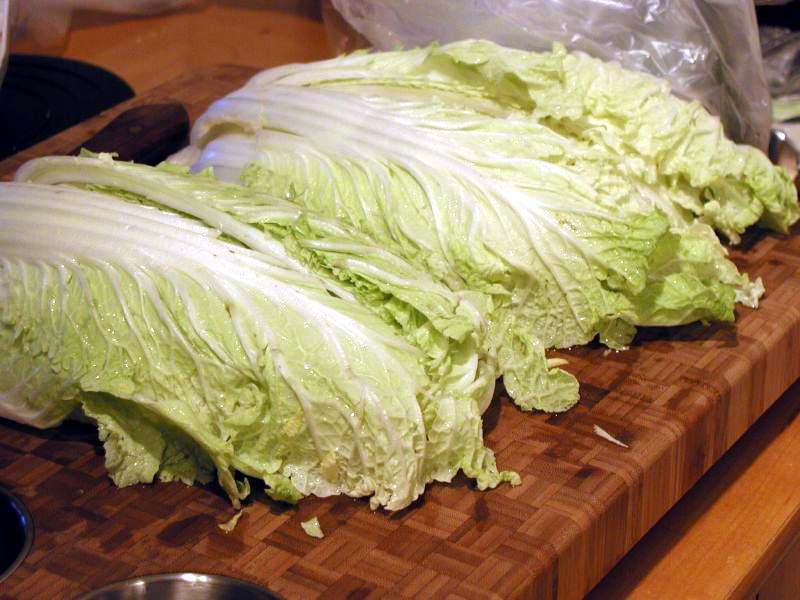
- Napa cabbages

Chinese name
- Chinese: 大白菜
- Literal meaning: big white vegetable
- Hanyu Pinyin: dàbáicài
- Wade–Giles: ta^{4}-pai^{2}-ts'ai^{4}

Cantonese name
- Traditional Chinese: 紹菜
- Yale Romanization: siuh choi
- Jyutping: siu^{6} coi^{3}

Korean name
- Hangul: 배추
- Revised Romanization: baechu
- McCune–Reischauer: paech'u

Japanese name
- Kanji: 白菜
- Hiragana: はくさい
- Revised Hepburn: hakusai

The word "napa" in the name napa cabbage comes from colloquial and regional Japanese, where nappa (菜っ葉) refers to the leaves of any vegetable, especially when used as food. The Japanese name for this specific variety of cabbage is hakusai (白菜), a Sino-Japanese reading of the Chinese name báicài (白菜), literally "white vegetable". The Korean name for napa cabbage, baechu (배추), is a nativized word from the Sino-Korean reading, baekchae, of the same Chinese character sets. Today in Mandarin Chinese, napa cabbage is known as dàbáicài (大白菜), literally "big white vegetable", as opposed to the "small white vegetable" that is known in English as bok choy.

Outside of Asia, this vegetable is also referred to as Chinese cabbage or sometimes celery cabbage. It is also known as siu choy in Western Canada (Cantonese 紹菜), wombok in Australia and wong bok or won bok in New Zealand, all corruptions of wong ngaa baak (Cantonese 黃芽白). In the United Kingdom this vegetable is known as Chinese leaf or winter cabbage, and in the Philippines as petsay (from Hokkien, 白菜 (pe̍h-tshài)) or pechay baguio. Another name used in English is petsai or pe-tsai.

== Origin ==
The first records of napa cabbage cultivation date back to the 15th century in the Yangtze River region in China. From China it later spread to Korea and Japan. Beginning in the 19th century with the Chinese diaspora, it was distributed to the rest of Asia, Europe, America as well as Australia. During the 19th century napa cabbage was first introduced to America from Europe and the supply of seed materials from Europe continued until World War I. After the blockade of the European seed supply, US government research institutes and the seed industry developed new seed stocks for vegetable crops. Oregon and California were the cabbage seed production areas during that time. Today it is cultivated and eaten throughout the world.

Napa cabbage might have originated from natural hybridization between turnip (Brassica rapa subsp. rapa) and pak-choi (Brassica rapa subsp. chinensis). Artificial crosses between these two subspecies, as well as molecular data, strengthen this suggestion.

== Description ==
Napa cabbage is a cool season annual vegetable which grows best when the days are short and mild. The plant grows to an oblong shaped head consisting of tightly arranged crinkly, thick, light-green leaves with prominent white veins. Innermost layer leaves feature light yellow color.

Napa cabbage belongs to the family Brassicaceae, commonly called the mustard or cabbage family. It is closely related to other species in its genus Brassica, like broccoli, cauliflower, cabbage, and kale, as well as other cruciferous vegetables like arugula and wasabi. It is a different cultivar of the same species as bok choy and turnip.

The leaves, which are the harvested organ, lay side by side densely, are lime green coloured with white leaf veins and have a smooth surface. The vegetable has an oval form and weighs 1 to 3 kg (2.2 to 6.6 lb). The leaves are organized in basal rosettes. The flowers are yellow and have a typical Brassicaceae cross-linked arrangement, hence the name Crucifereae, which means "cross-bearing". Because the plant is harvested in an earlier stage than flowering, normally the flowers are not visible on the field.

It develops similar to other head-forming leaf vegetables, such as cabbage and lettuce. The chronological stages on the BBCH-scale are germination, leaf formation, vegetative growth (head-forming), appearance of the sprout that bears the flowers, flowering, fruit development, seed ripening and senescence.

== Uses ==
Napa cabbage is widely used in China, Japan, and Korea. Napa cabbage is used as a sign of prosperity in China, and often appears as a symbol in glass and porcelain figures. The Jadeite Cabbage sculpture of Taiwan's National Palace Museum is a carving of a napa cabbage variety. It is also found in North American and Australian cities after Asian immigrants settled in the regions.

=== Culinary ===
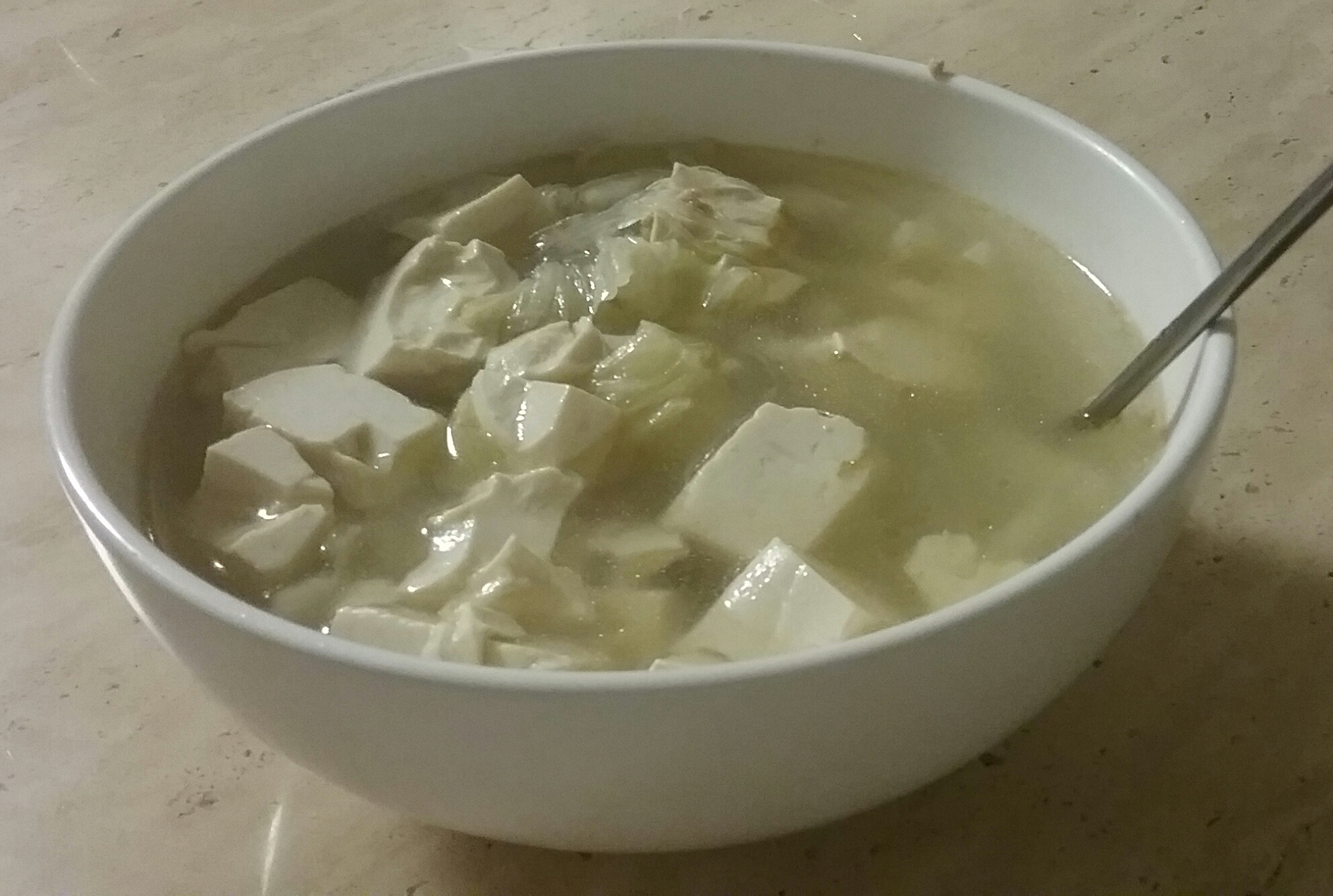
Napa cabbage and tofu soup

Chinese cabbage, raw
Nutritional value per 100 g (3.5 oz)
- Energy: 68 kJ (16 kcal)
- Carbohydrates: 3.2 g
- Dietary fiber: 1.2 g
- Fat: 0.2 g
- Protein: 1.2 g
Vitamins and minerals
Vitamins	Quantity %DV^{†}
Vitamin C	30% 27 mg
Minerals	Quantity %DV^{†}
Calcium	6% 77 mg
Iron	2% 0.31 mg
Magnesium	3% 13 mg
Sodium	0% 9 mg
- ^{†}Percentages estimated using US recommendations for adults.

Fermented napa cabbage (suan cai/sauerkraut) is a traditional food in Northeast China.

In Korean cuisine, napa cabbage is the main ingredient of baechu-kimchi, the most common type of kimchi, but is also eaten raw as a wrap for pork or oysters, dipped in gochujang. The outer, tougher leaves are used in soups. It can be used in stir-fry with other ingredients, such as tofu, mushroom and zucchini. It is also eaten with hot pot meals. Napa cabbage is particularly popular in South Korea's northern Gangwon Province. In European, American and Australian kitchens, it is more common to eat it cooked or raw as salad.

The vegetable is rich in vitamin C (26 mg/100g) and has a fair amount of calcium (40 mg/100g). It tastes mildly aromatic.

== Cultivation ==
Napa cabbage can be cultivated in many different areas of the world, the main area of diversification represents Asia. Napa cabbage is an annual plant that reaches the generative period in the first year. It must be consumed in its vegetative period, so there is a challenge in cultivation not to reach the stadium of flowering. The stadium of flowering can be initiated by cold temperatures or the length of the day. Napa cabbage reproduces mainly by allogamy. Napa cabbage produces more leaves, bigger leaves and a higher biomass under long day conditions than under short day conditions.

=== Soil requirements ===
Napa cabbage requires deeply loosened medium heavy soil. There must not be any compaction due to plowing. The crop achieves particularly high yields on sandy loam. Extremely sandy or claylike soils are not suitable. The crop prefers a pH range from 6.0 to 6.2, a high organic matter content and good moisture holding capacity of the soil. Lower pH or droughty soil can lead to calcium or magnesium deficiency and internal quality defects.

=== Climate requirements ===
Napa cabbage needs much water during the whole growth period. Often an irrigation system is needed, especially for August and September. The required amount of water depends on the stage of crop growth, weather conditions, and soil type. The most critical stage after establishment is when the head is forming. Inadequate water at this time will result in reduced uptake of calcium. This condition causes dead leaf tips within the head which makes it unmarketable. During head formation, 25 to 40 mm (1 to 1 1/2 in) of water per week is needed to maintain sustained growth rates.

Temperature requirements are low. Temperatures below 0 °C (32 °F) are tolerated for short time periods; persistent frosts below −5 °C (23 °F) are not endured. Too low temperature can induce premature bolting. The plants perform best under temperatures between 13 and 21 °C (55 and 70 °F), depending on the cultivar.

=== Seedbed requirements and sowing ===
Napa cabbage has very small seeds with a thousand kernel weight of about 2.5 to 2.8 g. For professional cultivation it is recommended to use disinfected seeds to prevent onset diseases. With the single-grain sowing technique, about 400 to 500 g of seeds per hectare is required; with the normal sowing technique, about 1 kg per hectare. If the normal sowing technique is used, the seedlings must be thinned out after two to four weeks. The seeds should be deposited 1 to 2 cm (0.39 to 0.79 in) deep, with a row width of 40 to 45 cm (16 to 18 in) and 25 to 30 cm (9.8 to 11.8 in) distance between the seeds.

The seedlings can be grown in the greenhouse and then transplanted into the field after two to three weeks. Earlier harvest can be achieved with this method. Seventy thousand to 80,000 seedlings per hectare are required. The transplanting method is normally used for the spring crop and the seeding technique for the fall crop.

=== Fertilization, field management ===
The nutrient removal of napa cabbage is high:

- 150–200 kg N per hectare
- 80–120 kg P_{2}O_{5} per hectare
- 180–250 kg K_{2}O per hectare
- 110–150 kg Ca per hectare
- 20–40 kg Mg per hectare

Fertilizer recommendations are in the range of the nutrient removal. Organic fertilizer must be applied before sowing due to the short cultivation time of napa cabbage and the slow availability of organic fertilizers. Synthetic N fertilizer should be applied in three equal doses. The last application must happen before two thirds of the cultivation time is over to avoid quality losses during storage.

Weeds should be controlled mechanically or chemically.

=== Harvest, storage and yield ===
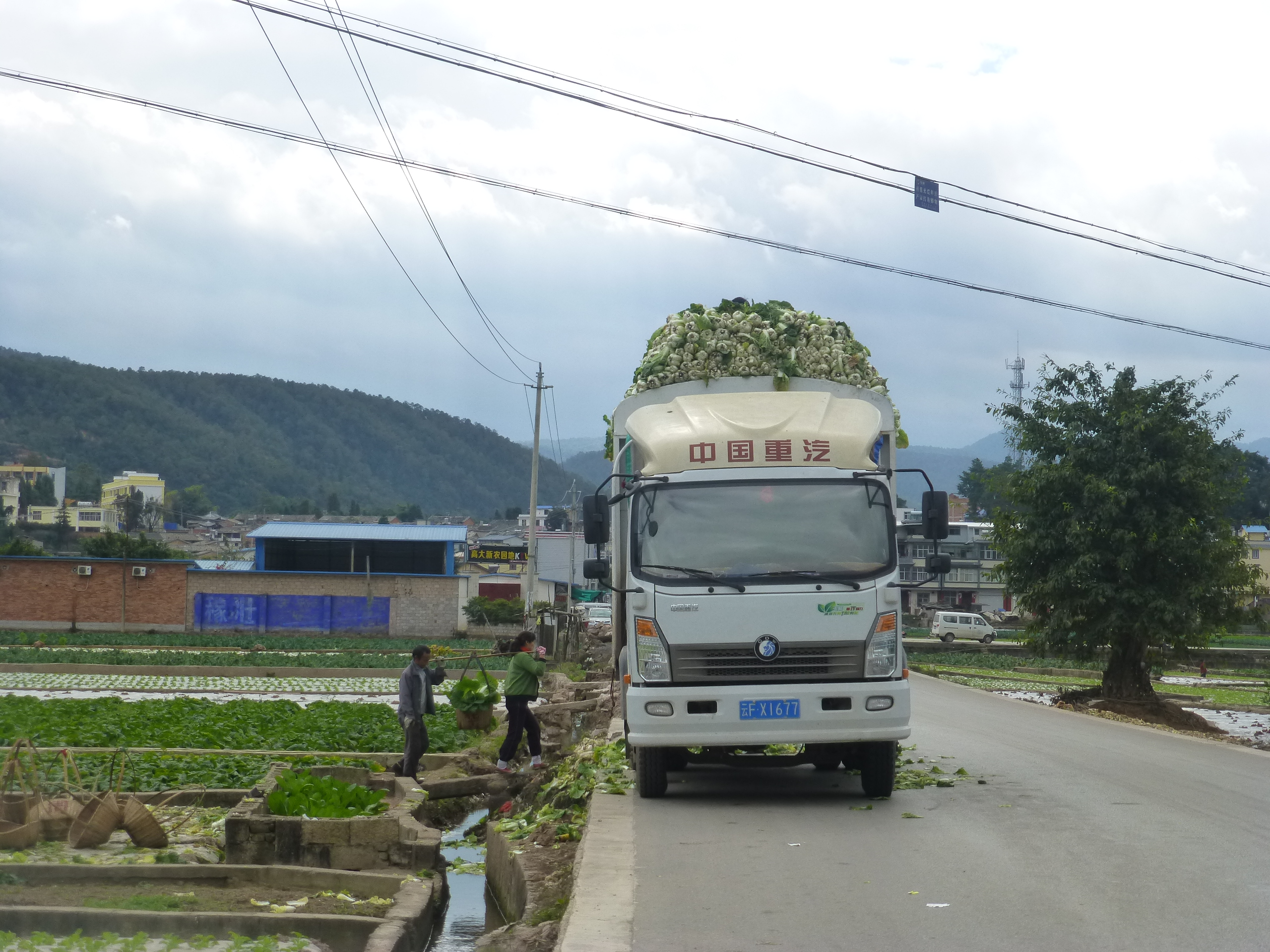
Harvested napa cabbage being loaded on a truck in Tonghai County, Yunnan

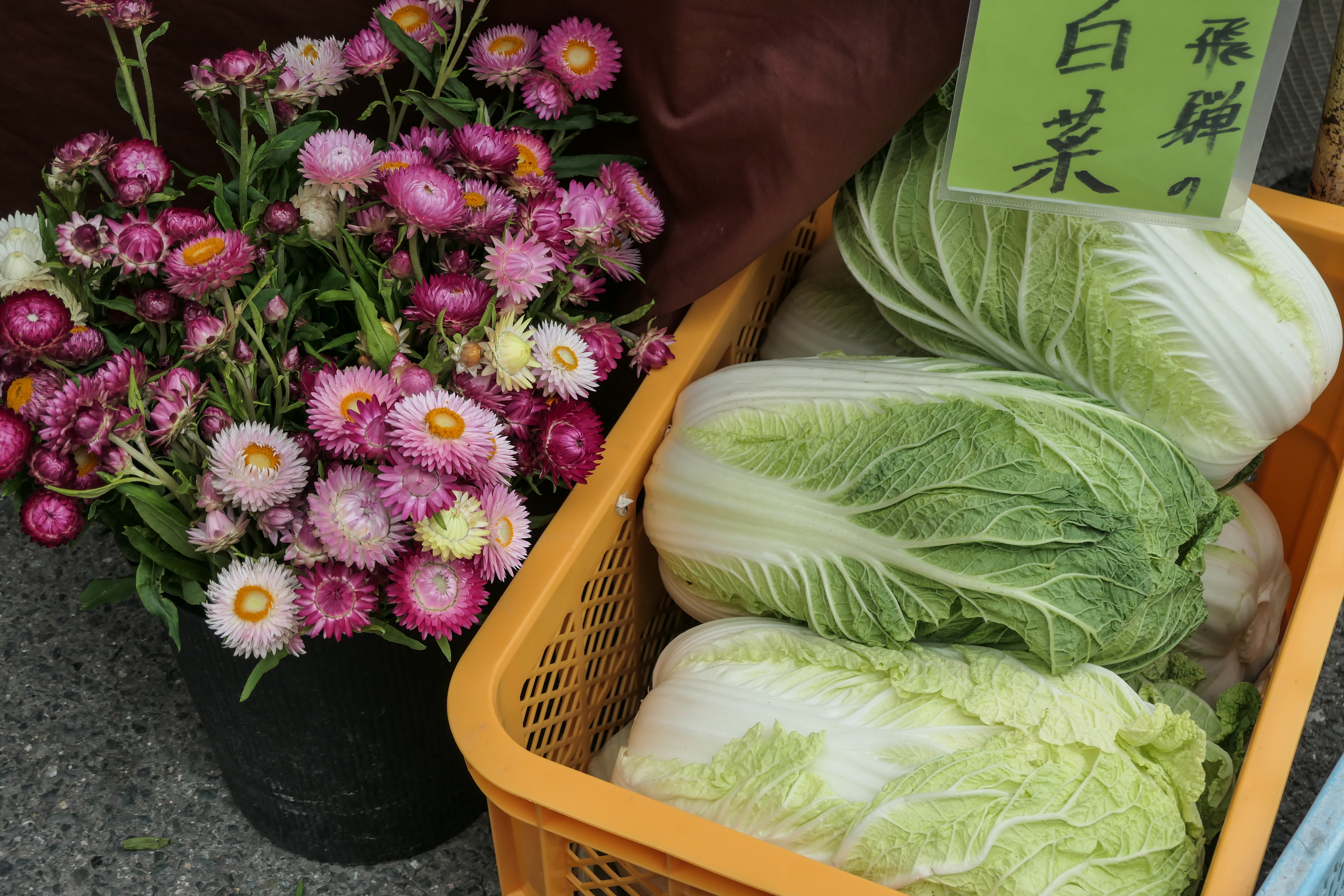
Napa cabbage sold in Japan

Napa cabbage can be harvested 8–12 weeks after sowing. The harvest work is mostly done by hand. The plant is cut 2.5 cm (1 in) above the ground. It is usual to harvest several times per field to achieve consistent cabbage quality. Cabbages will keep in good condition for three to four months in cool stores at 0–1 °C (32–34 °F) and 85 to 90 percent relative humidity. Napa cabbage achieves a yield of 4 to 5 kg/m^{2}.

=== Breeding ===
Brassica rapa species are diploid and have 10 chromosomes. A challenge for breeding of napa cabbage is the variable self-incompatibility. The self-incompatibility activity was reported to change by temperature and humidity. In vitro pollination with 98% relative humidity proved to be the most reliable as compared to greenhouse pollination.

A lot of work has already been done on breeding of napa cabbage. In the 21st century, 880 varieties of Napa cabbage were registered by the Korea Seed and Variety Service.

Breeding of napa cabbage was started by the Korean government research station of horticultural demonstration in 1906 to overcome starvation. As napa cabbage and radish are the main vegetables for kimchi, research focused on increasing yield. The most important person for this process was Dr. Woo Jang-choon who bred hybrid cultivars with self-incompatibility and contributed to commercial breeding by developing valuable materials and educating students. The main purpose of the hybrid cultivar was high yield and year-round production of napa cabbage after 1960.

To enable year round production of napa cabbage, it has to be modified to tolerate high and low temperatures. Normally, sowing in the late summer and harvesting in late autumn can produce high quality vegetables. As an example, a summer cultivar called “Nae-Seo-beak-ro” was developed 1973 by a commercial seed company. It tolerates high temperatures, could endure high humidity in the monsoon, and showed resistance to viral disease, soft rot and downy mildew. The low temperature in early spring reduces the quality of the vegetable and it cannot be used for kimchi. In the 1970s the developing of winter cultivars started. The majority of new cultivars could not endure the cold winter conditions and disappeared. The cultivar “Dong-Pung” (meaning “east wind”) was developed in 1992 and showed a high resistance to cold temperature. It is mostly used in Korea, where fresh napa cabbage is nowadays cultivated year round.

In the 1970s, one seed company developed the rose-shape heading variety while other seed companies focused on the semi-folded heading type. As a result of continuous breeding in the commercial seed companies and the government research stations, farmers could now select what they wanted from among various high quality hybrids of Chinese cabbage. The fall season cultivar 'Yuki', with white ribs and tight leaf folding, gained the RHS's Award of Garden Merit (AGM) in 2003.

In 1988, the first cultivar with yellow inner leaf was introduced. This trait has prevailed until today.

A very important breeding aim is to get varieties with resistance to pests and diseases. There exist varieties with resistance to turnip mosaic virus but as mentioned above, there exist numerous other diseases. There have been attempts to breed varieties with clubroot resistance or powdery mildew resistance but the varieties failed due to bad leaf texture traits or broken resistances.

== Pests and diseases ==
=== Gomasho ===
Gomasho (ゴマ症), also known as pepper spots, is a cosmetic defect affecting leaves' surfaces, primarily the outer ones. It takes a form of spots appearing on the white parts of a leaf, with clearly defined edges, usually elongated, up to 2 mm in size. The color ranges from brown to black. A spot is formed through a collapse of cell walls and may be invisible during harvest and packing, only becoming apparent after storing in cold.

No pathogen is known to cause pepper spots and affected leaves are safe to eat. The formation of gomasho has been linked to high nitrogen levels in fertilizers. The defect has to be differentiated from fungal diseases and soil fragments.

=== Fungal diseases ===
Alternaria diseases are caused by the organisms Alternaria brassicae, Alternaria brassicicola and Alternaria japonica. Their English names are black spot (not to be confused with midrib 'pepper spots' which are physiological in origin and often result from improper storage), pod spot, gray leaf spot, dark leaf spot or Alternaria blight. The symptoms can be seen on all aboveground plant parts as dark spots. The infected plants are shrivelled and smaller than normal. Alternaria diseases infect almost all brassica plants, the most important hosts are oilseed brassicas. The fungus is a facultative parasite, what means that it can survive on living hosts as well as on dead plant tissue. Infected plant debris is in most circumstances the primary source of inoculum. The spores can be dispersed by wind to host plants in the field or to neighbouring brassica crops. This is why cross infections often occur in areas where different brassica crops are cultivated in close proximity. The disease spreads especially fast when the weather is wet and the plants have reached maturity. Alternaria brassicae is well adapted to temperate regions while Alternaria brassicicola occurs primarily in warmer parts of the world. Temperature requirement for Alternaria japonica is intermediate. There exist some wild accessions of Brassica rapa subsp. pekinensis with resistance to Alternaria brassicae but not on commercial cultivars. These resistances should be included to breeding programmes. Alternaria epidemics are best avoided by management practices like at least 3 years non-host crops between brassica crops, incorporation of plant debris into the soil to accelerate decomposition and usage of disease-free seeds.

Anhracnose is a brassica disease caused by Colletotrichum higginsianum that is especially damaging on napa cabbage, pak choi, turnip, rutabaga and tender green mustard. The symptoms are dry pale gray to straw spots or lesions on the leaves. The recommended management practices are the same as for Alternaria diseases.

Black root is a disease that infects mainly radish, but it also occurs on many other brassica vegetables inclusively napa cabbage. It caused by the fungus Aphanomyces raphani. The pathogen can persist for long times in the soil, therefore crop rotations are an essential management tool.

White leaf spot is found primarily in temperate climate regions and is important on vegetable brassicas and oilseed rape. The causal organism is Mycosphaerella capsellae. The symptoms are white spots on leaves, stems and pods and can thus easily be confused with those of downy mildew. The disease spreads especially fast with rain or moisture and temperature is between 10 and 15 °C (50 and 59 °F).

Yellows, also called Fusarium wilt, is another Brassica disease that infects oilseed rape, cabbage, mustards, Napa cabbage and other vegetable brassicas. It is only a problem in regions with warm growing seasons where soil temperatures are in the range of 18 to 32 °C. The causal organism is Fusarium oxysporum f. sp. conlutinans. Napa cabbage is relatively tolerant to the disease; mostly the only external symptoms are yellowing of lower, older leaves. The disease is soil borne and can survive for many years in the absence of a host. Most cruciferous weeds can serve as alternate hosts.

Damping-Off is a disease in temperate areas caused by soil inhabiting oomycetes like Phytophthora cactorum and Pythium spp. The disease concerns seedlings, which often collapse and die.

Other diseases that infect napa cabbage:

- black leg or phoma stem cancer: Leptosphaeria maculans
- clubroot: Plasmodiophora brassicae
- Downy mildew: Hyaloperonospora brassicae
- Powdery mildew: Erysiphe radulescui
- Rhizoctonia solani
- Sclerotinia sclerotiorum

=== Bacterial diseases ===
Bacterial soft rot is considered one of the most important diseases of vegetable brassicas. The disease is particularly damaging in warm humid climate. The causal organisms are Erwinia carotovora var. carotovora and Pseudomonas marginalis pv. marginalis. The rot symptoms can occur in the field, on produce transit or in storage. Bacteria survive mainly on plant residues in the soil. They are spread by insects and by cultural practices, such as irrigation water and farm machinery. The disease is tolerant to low temperatures; it can spread in storages close to 0 °C, by direct contact and by dripping onto the plants below. Bacterial soft rot is more severe on crops which have been fertilized too heavily with nitrogen, had late nitrogen applications, or are allowed to become over-mature before harvesting.

Black rot, the most important disease of vegetable brassicas, is caused by Xanthomonas campestris pv. campestris.

=== Virus diseases ===
- Cucumber mosaic virus
- Radish mosaic virus
- Ribgrass mosaic virus
- Turnip crinkle virus
- Cardamine chlorotic fleck virus
- Turnip mosaic virus
- Turnip yellow mosaic virus

=== Insect pests ===
- large white butterfly (Pieris brassicae)
- cabbage root fly (Delia radicum)
- cabbage seed weevil (Ceutorhynchus assimilis)
- cabbage looper
- cabbage beetle (Colaphellus bowringi)
- diamondback moth
- small white butterfly (Pieris rapae)
- aphids
- cucumber beetles
- stink bugs
- Vegetable weevils
- Mole crickets
- cutworms

=== Other pests and diseases ===
Aster yellows is a disease caused by a phytoplasm.

Nematodes are disease agents that are often overlooked but they can cause considerable yield losses. The adult nematodes have limited active movement but their eggs contained within cysts (dead females) are readily spread with soil, water, equipment or seedlings.

Parasitic nematode species that cause damage on napa cabbage:

- Heterodera schachtii
- Meloidogyne hapla
- Nacobbus batatiformis
- Rotylenchulus reniformis

== See also ==
- Nabemono
