= Bok choy =

Leaf vegetable

Bok choy (Pechay)
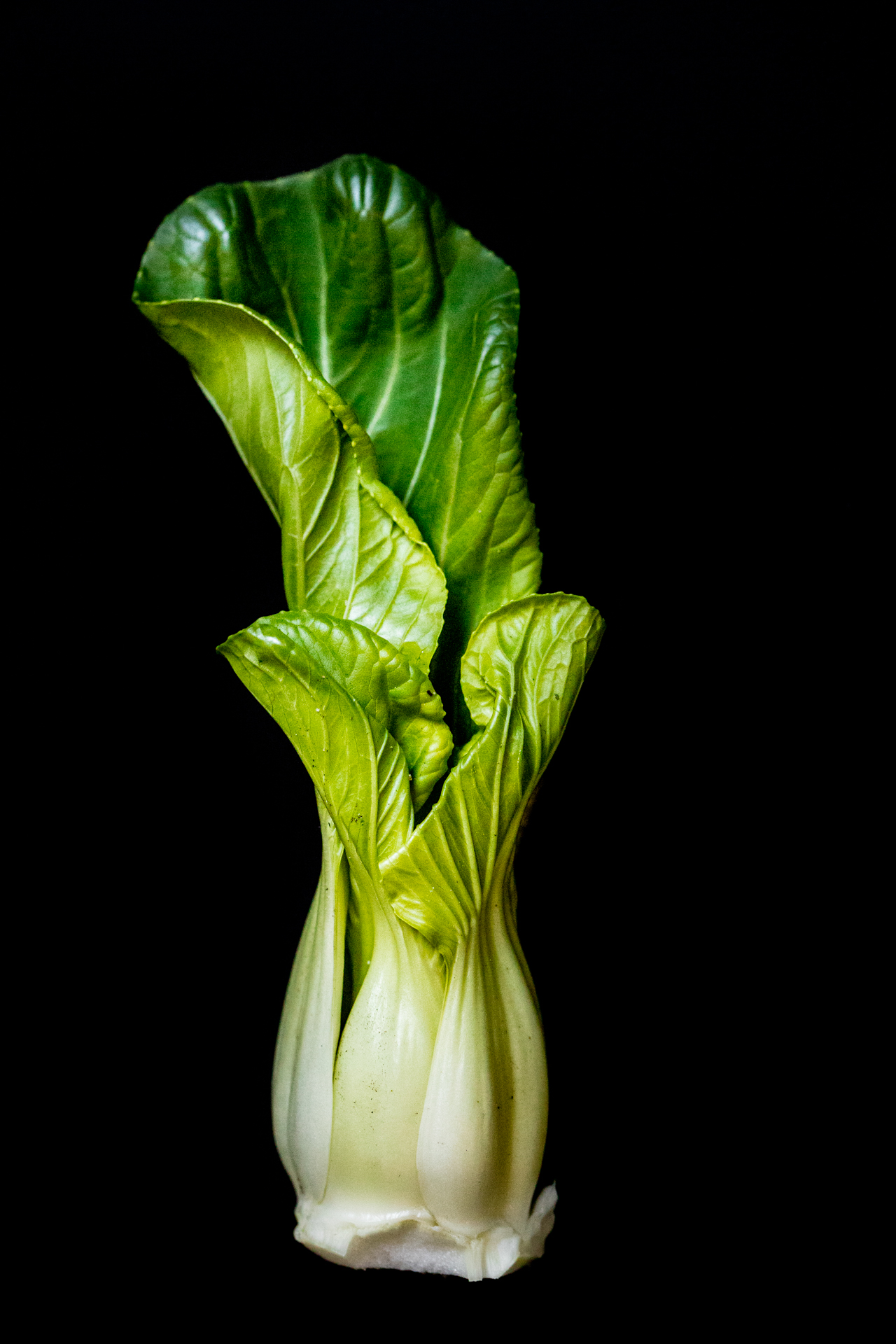
- Brassica rapa subsp. chinensis
- Species: Brassica rapa
- Cultivar group: Chinensis
- Origin: China, 5th century

Bok choy (American English, Canadian English, and Australian English), pak choi (British English, South African English, and Caribbean English) or pok choi is a type of Chinese cabbage (Brassica rapa subsp. chinensis) cultivated as a leaf vegetable to be used as food. Varieties do not form heads and have green leaf blades with lighter bulbous bottoms instead, forming a cluster reminiscent of mustard greens. Its flavor is described as being between spinach and water chestnuts but slightly sweeter, with a mildly peppery undertone. The green leaves have a stronger flavor than the white bulb.

Chinensis varieties are popular in southern China, East Asia, and Southeast Asia. Originally classified as Brassica chinensis by Carl Linnaeus, they are now considered a subspecies of Brassica rapa. They are a member of the family Brassicaceae.

== Spelling and naming variations ==
Cooked bok choy
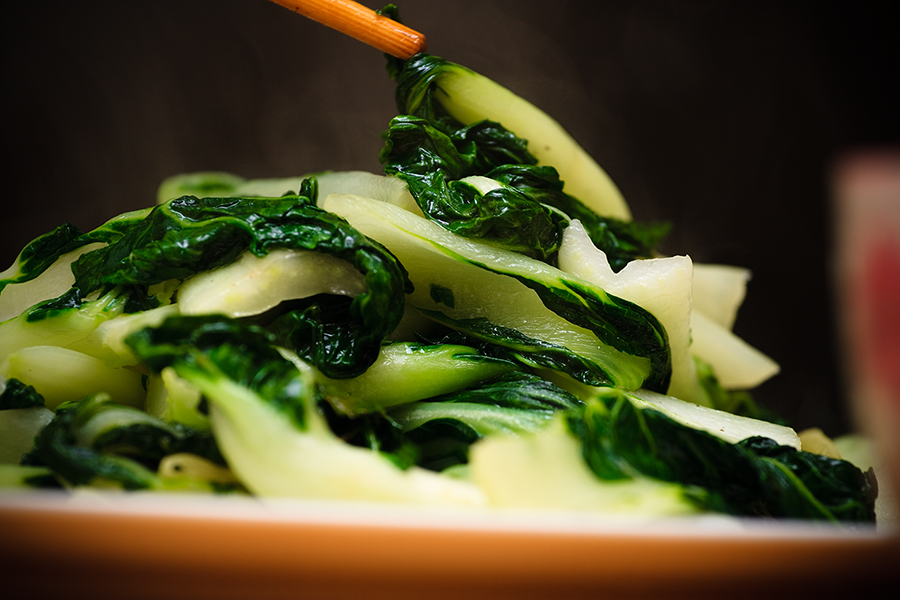

Chinese name
- Chinese: 青菜, 小白菜 (Mandarin Chinese)
- Hanyu Pinyin: qīngcài, xiǎobáicài
- Bopomofo: ㄑㄧㄥ ㄘㄞˋ, ㄒㄧㄠˇ ㄅㄞˊ ㄘㄞˋ
- Gwoyeu Romatzyh: chingtsay, sheaubairtsay
- IPA: [tɕʰíŋ.tsʰâɪ], [ɕjàʊ.pǎɪ.tsʰâɪ]
- Romanization: tsching tsae

Cantonese and Southern Min name
- Chinese: 白菜
- Yale Romanization: baahk choi
- Jyutping: baak^{6} coi^{3}
- IPA: [pàːk tsʰɔ̄ːy]
- Hokkien POJ: pe̍h-chhài or pe̍eh-chhài

Korean name
- Hangul: 청경채
- Hanja: 靑莖菜
- Revised Romanization: cheonggyeongchae

Japanese name
- Kanji: 青梗菜
- Katakana: チンゲンサイ
- Romanization: chingensai

Other than the term "Chinese cabbage", the most widely used name in North America for the chinensis variety is bok choy (from Cantonese baak choi for "white vegetable") or siu bok choy (Cantonese, for "small white vegetable", as opposed to dai bok choy meaning "big white vegetable", referring to the larger napa cabbage). It is also sometimes spelled as pak choi, bok choi, and pak choy. In the UK, South Africa, and the Caribbean the term pak choi is used. Less commonly, the names Chinese chard, Chinese mustard, celery mustard, and spoon cabbage are also used.

There are two main types of bok choy, one type known for darker green leaves and white stems, the other with lighter green leaves and green stems, collectively called 小白菜 xiǎo bái cài ("small white vegetable") in Mandarin. The white-stemmed variety, primarily cultivated in South China, is known as white bok choy in Mandarin (Chinese: 奶白菜; lit. 'milky white vegetable'), while in Cantonese it is simply called baak choi (Chinese: 白菜; lit. 'white vegetable'; confusion may arise here as the same characters of the latter, pronounced bái cài by Mandarin speakers, are preferably used for napa cabbage). The other green-stemmed bok choy is more common in East China, and is named differently across Chinese-language regions (Chinese: 青白菜; lit. 'green white vegetable'; Chinese: 青菜; lit. 'green vegetable'; Chinese: 上海青; lit. 'Shanghai green'; Chinese: 青梗菜; lit. 'green-stalk vegetable'; Chinese: 小唐菜; lit. 'small Chinese/Tang vegetable'). There is little understanding of the differentiation in common English-language usage, and the green stemmed variety is often simply named bok choy, though some sellers do separate out the produce as green bok choy. The young and tender plants of green bok choy is commonly named 'chicken feather vegetable' in mainland China (Chinese: 雞毛菜; lit. 'chicken-feather vegetable'); it is less crisp and therefore may be easily overcooked. Baby bok choy can refer to the young plants of any variety of bok choy.

In Australia, the New South Wales Department of Primary Industries has redefined many transcribed names to refer to specific cultivars. They have introduced the word buk choy to refer to white bok choy and redefined pak choy to refer to green bok choy.

== Growing preferences ==
Bok choy prefers fertile, well-draining soil, high in organic matter with a pH of 6.0 to 7.5. Amend with compost or well-rotted manure before planting. It is a heavy feeder, especially nitrogen, and needs consistently moist soil throughout the season. Drying out or temperatures above 70° Fahrenheit (21 °C) will trigger bolting. Ideal temperature range is 55° to 70° Fahrenheit and most varieties mature in 30 to 60 days.

== Uses ==
=== Cooking ===
Bok choy cooks in 2 to 3 minutes by steaming, stir-frying, or simmering in water (8 minutes if steamed whole). The leaves cook faster than the stem. It is often used in similar ways to other leafy vegetables such as spinach and cabbage. It can also be eaten raw. It is commonly used in salads.

=== Preserving ===
Dried bok choy has saltier, more concentrated flavour, while pickled bok choy can remain edible for months. Immature plants tend to have sweeter, more tender stems and leaves.

== Nutritional value ==
Bok choy, raw
Nutritional value per 100 g (3.5 oz)
- Energy: 20 kcal (84 kJ)
- Carbohydrates: 3.4 g
- Dietary fiber: 1.3 g
- Fat: 0.2 g
- Protein: 1.0 g
Vitamins and minerals
Vitamins	Quantity %DV^{†}
Folate (B9)	17% 68 μg
Vitamin C	33% 30 mg
Minerals	Quantity %DV^{†}
Calcium	5% 62 mg
Copper	3% 0.028 mg
Iron	2% 0.44 mg
Magnesium	3% 13.6 mg
Manganese	9% 0.20 mg
Potassium	8% 228 mg
Sodium	1% 14 mg
Zinc	2% 0.27 mg
- Other constituents: Quantity
- Water: 94.5 g
- Link to Full Report in USDA Nutrient Database
- ^{†}Percentages estimated using US recommendations for adults, except for potassium, which is estimated based on expert recommendation from the National Academies.

The raw vegetable is 94% water, 3% carbohydrates, 1% protein and less than 1% fat (table). In a reference amount of 100 grams (3.5 oz), raw bok choy provides 20 calories of food energy, and is a rich source (20% or more of the Daily Value, DV) of vitamin C, while providing folate in a moderate amount (table).

== History ==
Bok choy evolved from the mustard plant in China, where it has been cultivated since the 5th century CE. It can be traced to the Yangtze River delta area, one of the world's oldest agricultural regions. It also has been traced to the Yellow River Valley where archaeologists found Chinese cabbage seeds dating back 6,000 years.

As bok choy grew in use, it spread to other parts of Asia and was eventually cultivated in countries such as Japan, Malaysia, Indonesia, and the Philippines. Bok choy plantations were present in Japan and Malaya by the early 19th century. In Malaya, bok choy was not commonly consumed by the poor.

The vegetable was introduced to Europe in the mid-18th century. A Swede named Osbeck brought bok choy seeds to Europe during the same time period Jesuit missionaries brought similar strains of the vegetable to German scientists working in Russia. Bok choy was introduced to North America in the 19th century, but did not gain in use for another century.

== Gallery ==
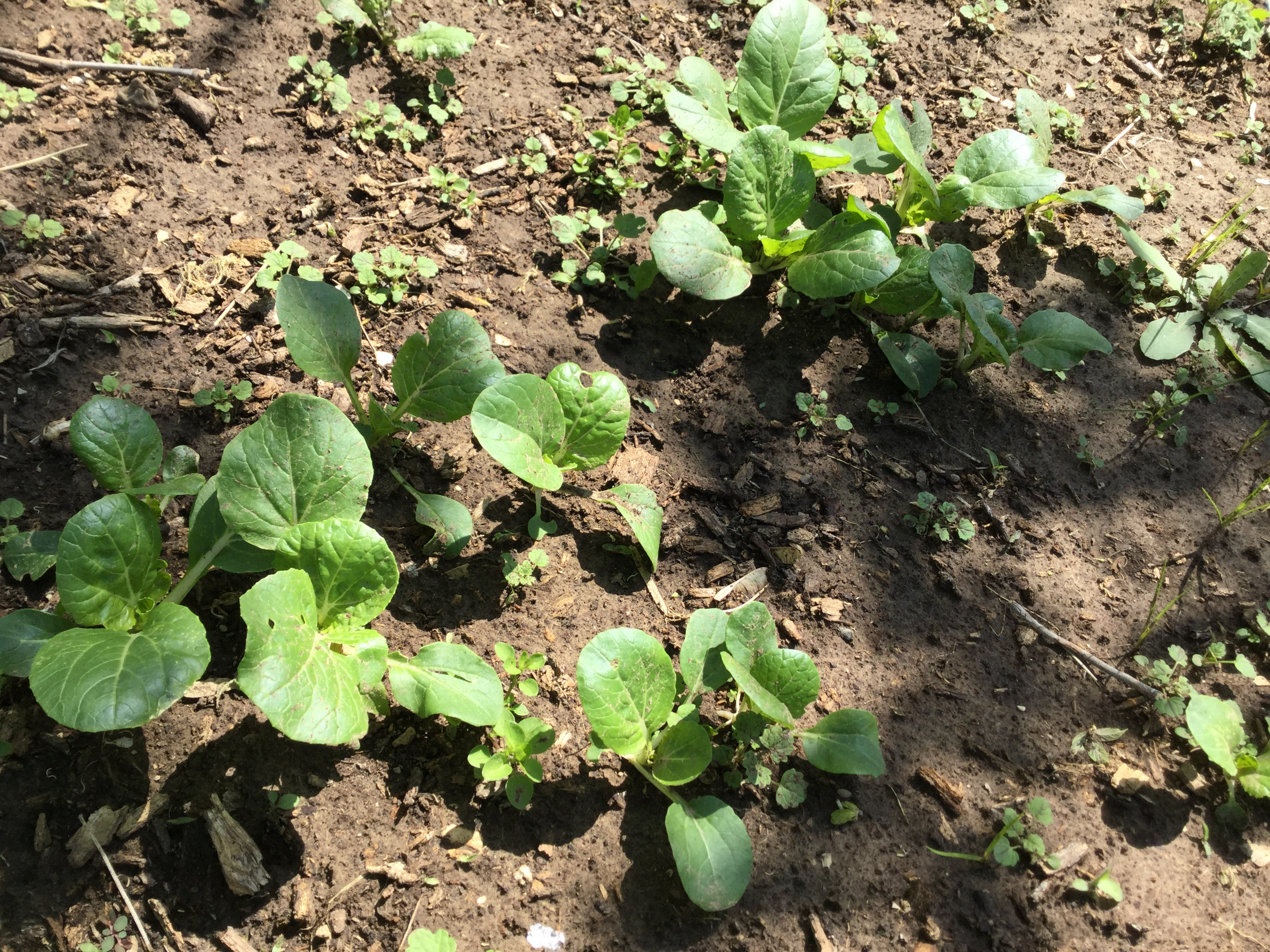
Young bok choy plants in a garden

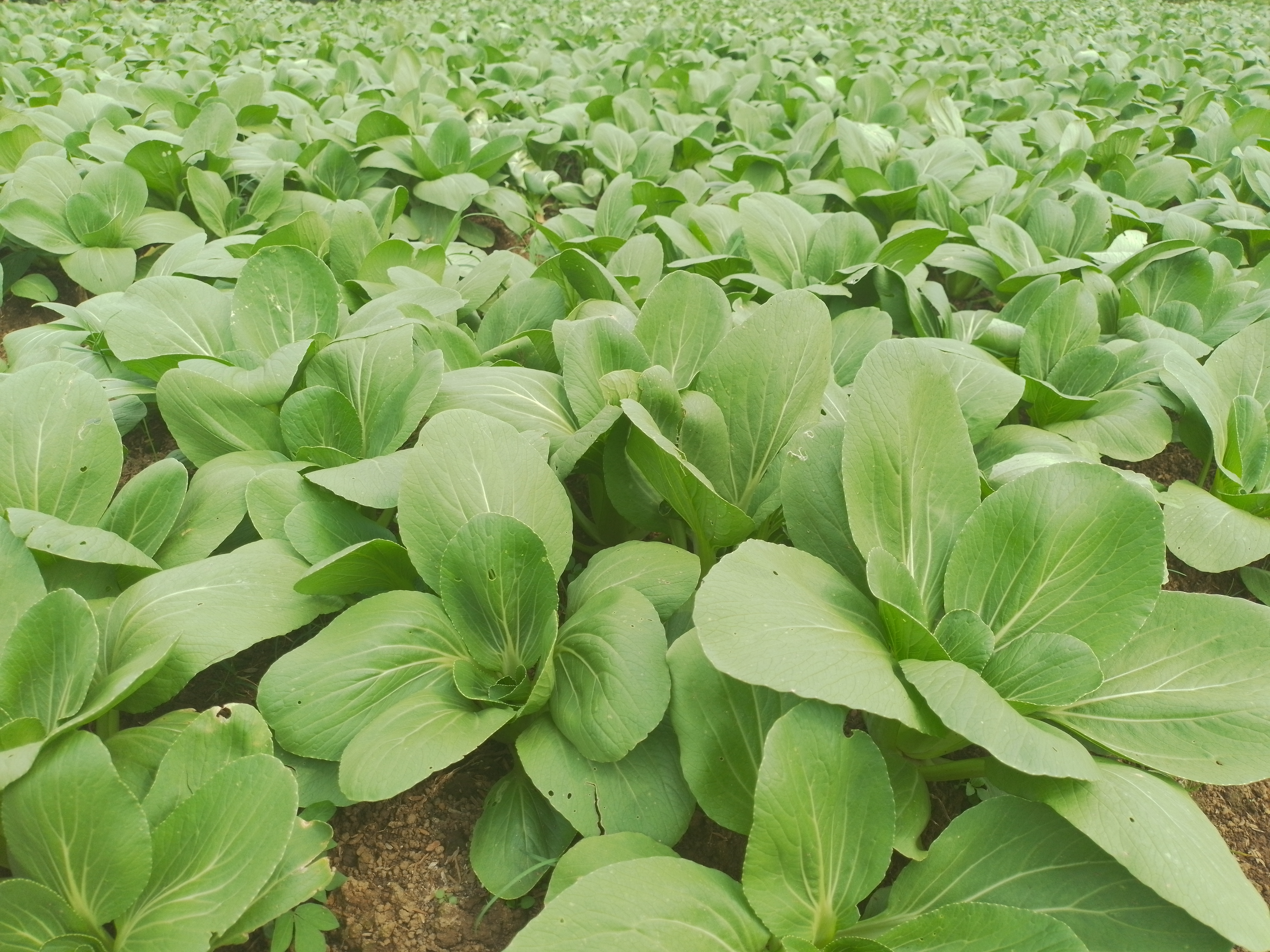
A bok choy field

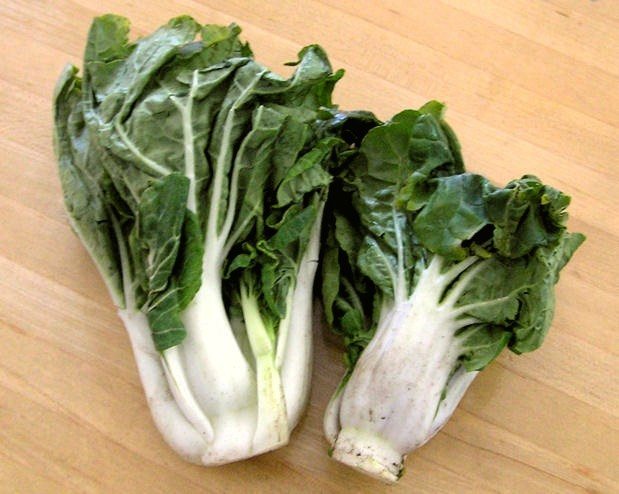
White bok choy

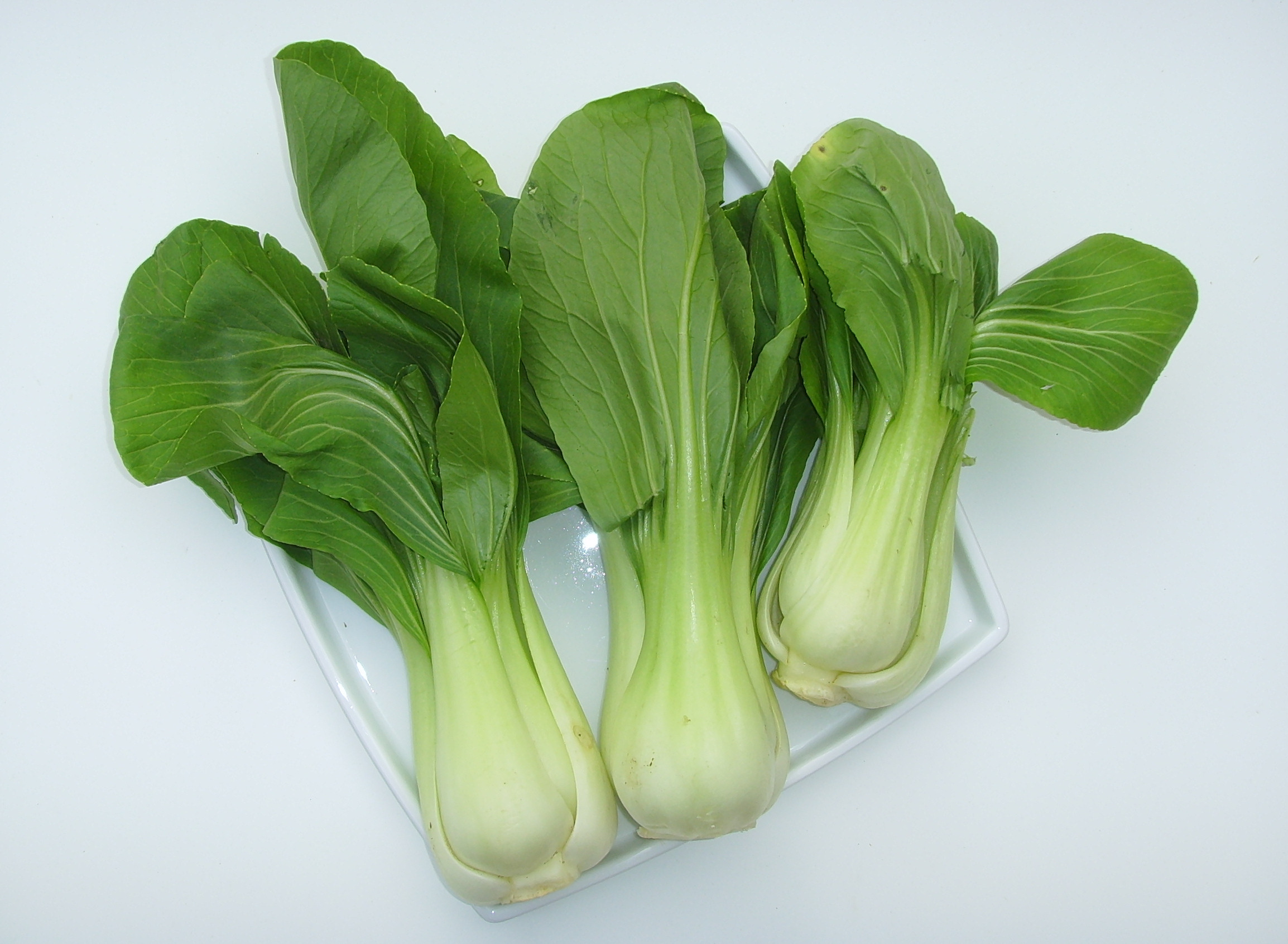
Green bok choy

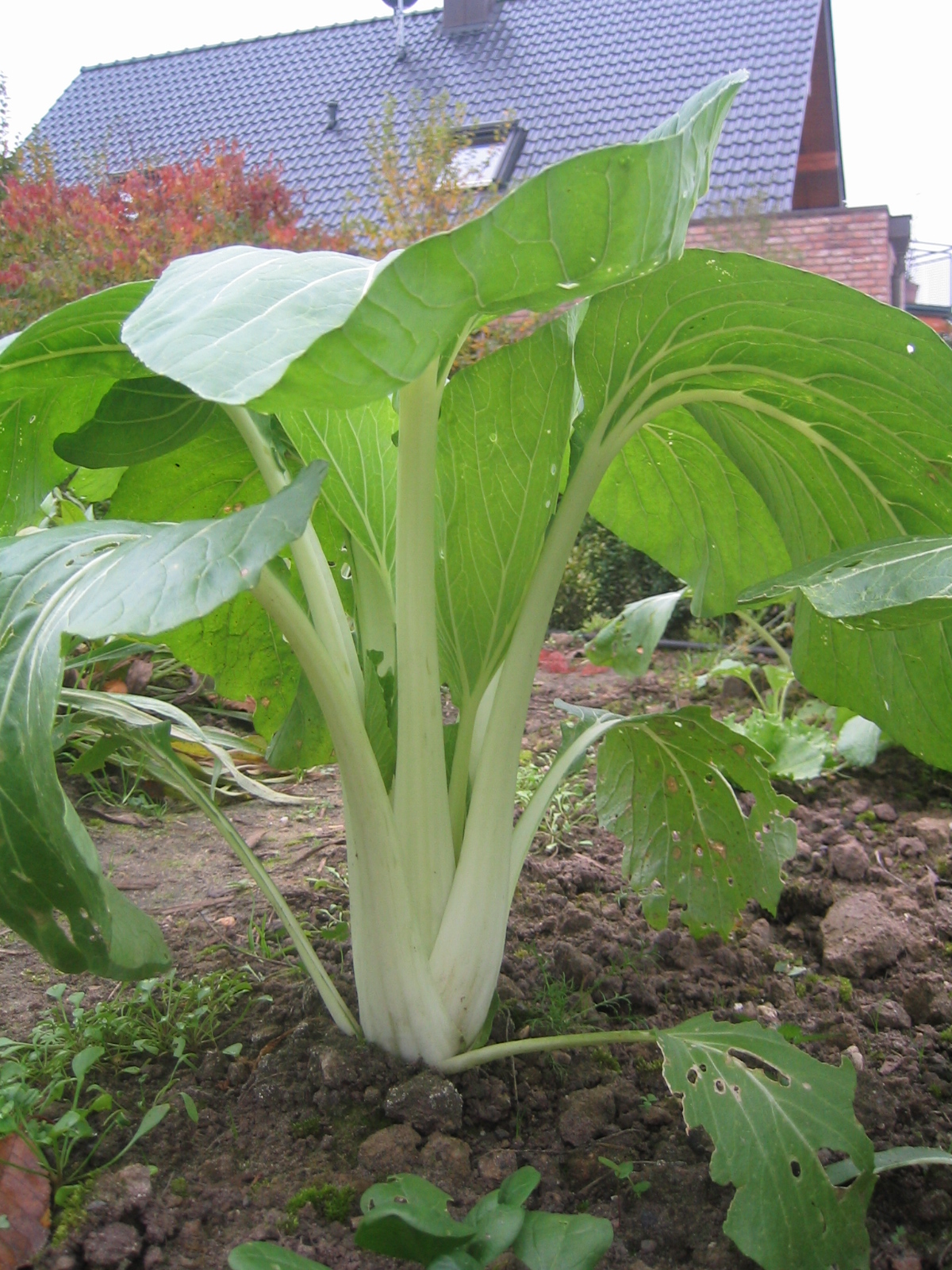
Bok choy plant from a side view

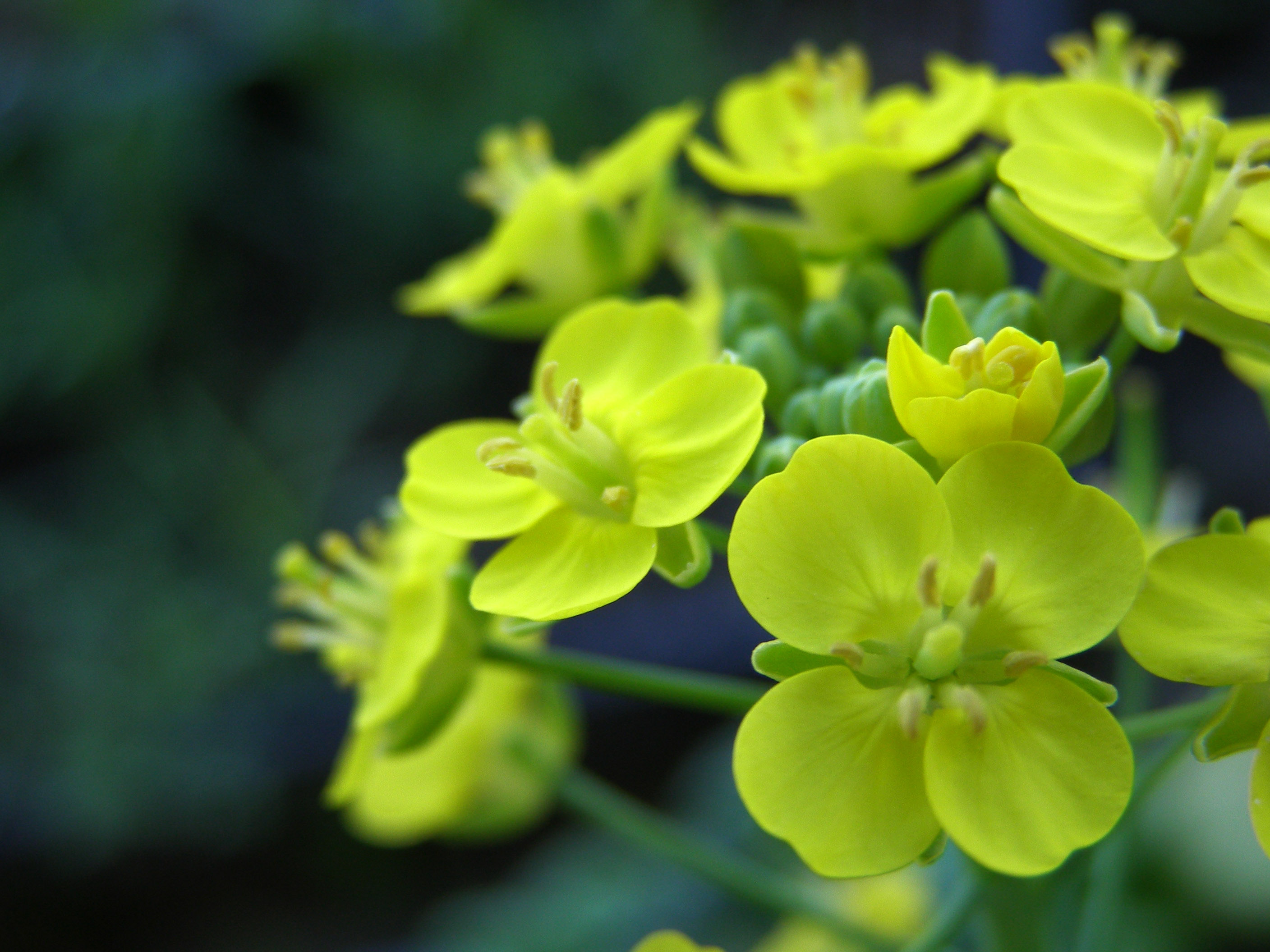
Bok choy has yellow flowers.

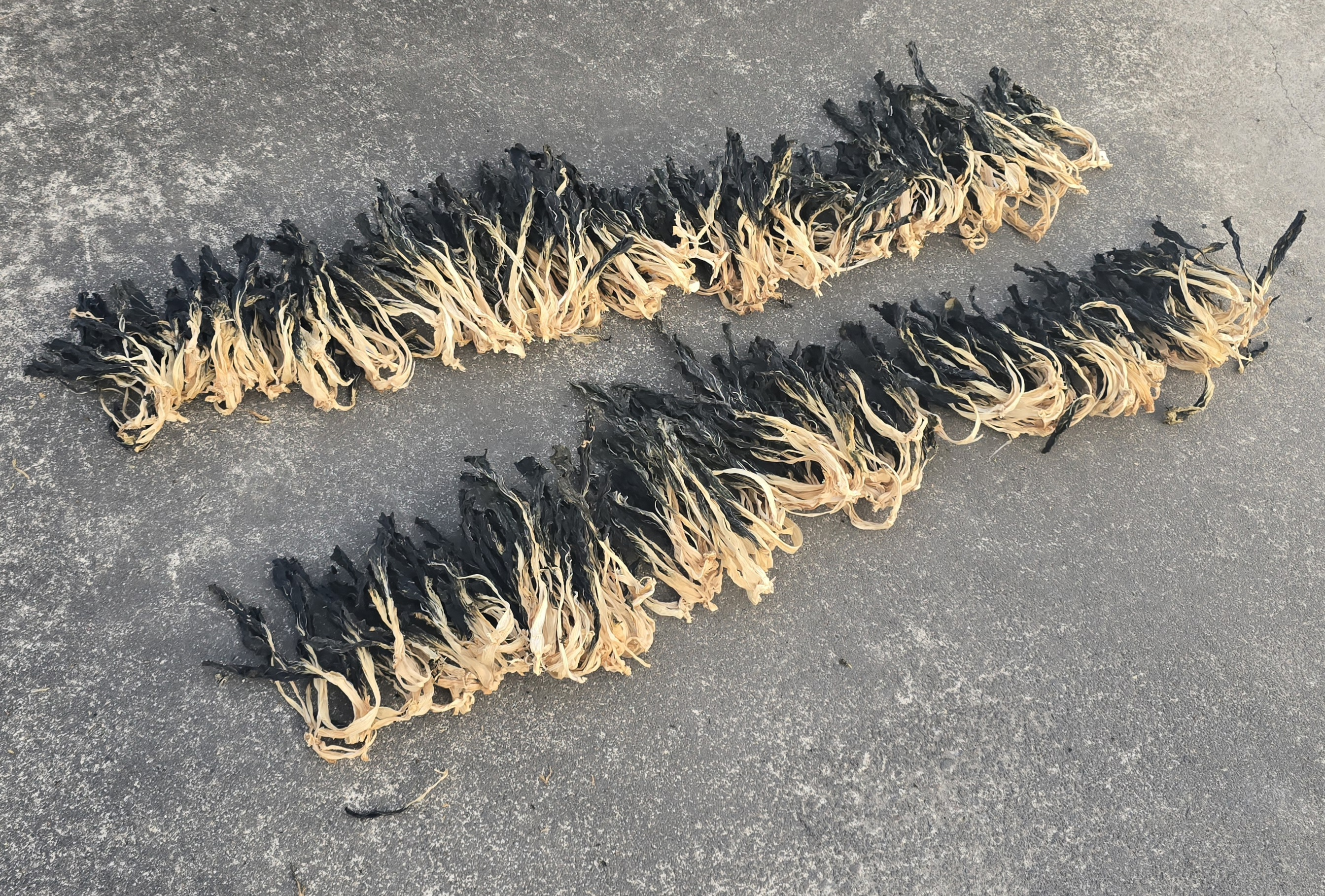
White bok choy laid on the ground after sun-drying

== See also ==
- Choy sum
- Gai lan
- List of leaf vegetables
