= Vostok-L =

1960s Soviet rocket

Vostok-L (8K72)
- Vostok-L rocket
- Function: Small-lift launch vehicle
- Manufacturer: OKB-1
- Country of origin: Soviet Union

Size
- Height: 30.84 m (101.2 ft)
- Diameter: 2.6 m (8 ft 6 in)
- Stages: 3

Capacity

Payload to LEO
- Mass: 4,550 kg (10,030 lb)

Associated rockets
- Family: R-7
- Derivative work: Vostok-K

Launch history
- Status: Retired
- Launch sites: Baikonur, Site 1/5
- Total launches: 4
- Success(es): 3
- Failure: 1
- First flight: 15 May 1960
- Last flight: 1 December 1960
- Carries passengers or cargo: Korabl-Sputnik

Boosters (First stage) – Block B, V, G & D (Note: This is a transliteration of the second through fifth letters of the Cyrillic alphabet (Б, В, Г, Д). A sense-for-sense translation would correspond to the second through fifth letters of the Latin alphabet, 'Block B, C, D & E'.)
- No. boosters: 4
- Powered by: 1 × RD-107-8D74
- Maximum thrust: 970 kN (220,000 lb_{f})
- Total thrust: 3,880 kN (870,000 lb_{f})
- Burn time: 120 seconds
- Propellant: LOX / RP-1

Second stage (core) – Block A
- Powered by: 1 × RD-108-8D75
- Maximum thrust: 912 kN (205,000 lb_{f})
- Burn time: 310 seconds
- Propellant: LOX / RP-1

Third stage
- Powered by: 1 × RD-0105
- Maximum thrust: 49.42 kN (11,110 lb_{f})
- Burn time: 390 seconds
- Propellant: LOX / RP-1

Vostok‑L (Russian: Восток, lit. 'East', GRAU index: 8K72) was a rocket used by the Soviet Union to conduct several early tests of the Vostok spacecraft.

It was derived from the Luna rocket, with a slightly enlarged third stage to accommodate the larger payload. and was a member of the Vostok family of rockets.

== Launches ==
Four launches were conducted between 15 May and 1 December 1960, from Baikonur LC-1/5, three of which successfully reached orbit.

The first flight, on 15 May 1960, carried the Korabl-Sputnik 1 spacecraft. The second launched on 28 July, however one of the booster engines exploded during launch, causing the booster to separate prematurely, 19 seconds after launch. The rocket broke up 30 seconds after liftoff, killing the two dogs that were aboard the spacecraft. The third flight successfully placed Korabl-Sputnik 2 into orbit on 19 August, whilst the fourth and final flight orbited Korabl-Sputnik 3 on 1 December.

Serial No.	Date	Payload	Result
L1-11	15 May 1960	Korabl-Sputnik 1	Success
L1-10	28 July 1960	Korabl-Sputnik (2)	Failure
L1-12	19 August 1960	Korabl-Sputnik 2	Success
L1-13	1 December 1960	Korabl-Sputnik 3	Success

The Vostok-L was replaced by an uprated version, the Vostok-K, which offered a greater payload capacity.
