= Korabl-Sputnik 5 =

Soviet spacecraft

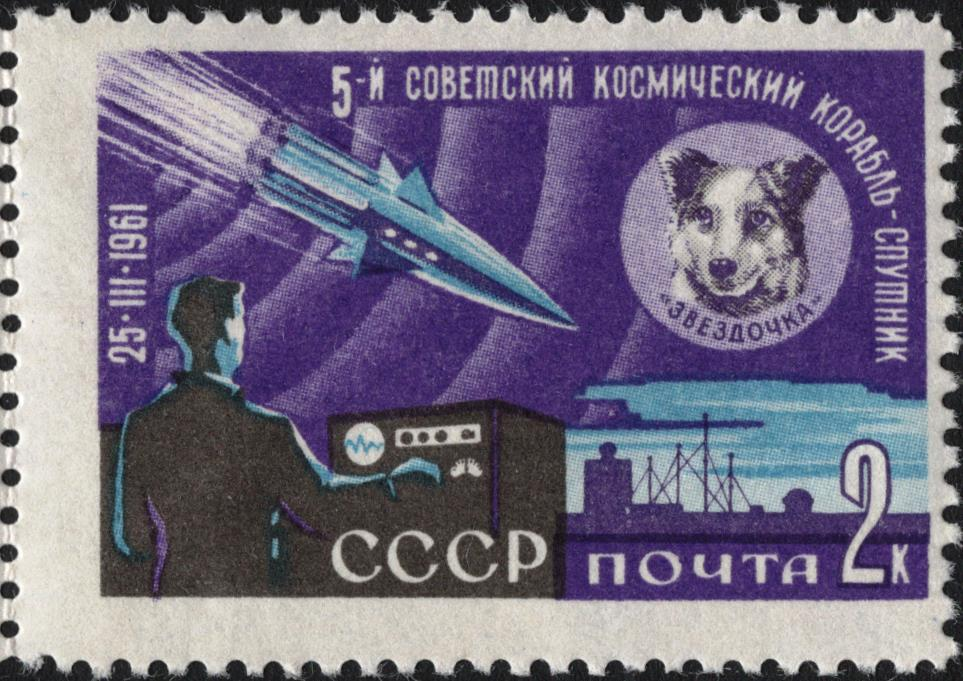
- Names: Sputnik 10
- Mission type: Biological; Technology
- Operator: Soviet space program
- Harvard designation: 1961 Iota 1
- COSPAR ID: 1961-009A
- SATCAT no.: 95
- Mission duration: 1 hour, 46 minutes

Spacecraft properties
- Spacecraft type: Vostok-3KA
- Manufacturer: OKB-1
- Launch mass: 4,695 kilograms (10,351 lb)

Start of mission
- Launch date: 25 March 1961, 05:54:00 UTC
- Rocket: Vostok-K 8K72K
- Launch site: Baikonur 1/5

End of mission
- Landing date: 25 March 1961, 07:40 UTC

Orbital parameters
- Reference system: Geocentric
- Regime: Low Earth
- Eccentricity: 0.00501
- Perigee altitude: 164 kilometres (102 mi)
- Apogee altitude: 230 kilometres (140 mi)
- Inclination: 64.9 degrees
- Period: 88.42 minutes
- Epoch: 25 March 1961, 01:00:00 UTC

Korabl-Sputnik 5 (Russian: Корабль-Спутник 5 meaning Ship-Satellite 5) or Vostok-3KA No.2, also known as Sputnik 10 in the West, was a Soviet spacecraft which was launched in 1961, as part of the Vostok programme. It was the last test flight of the Vostok spacecraft design prior the first crewed flight, Vostok 1. It carried the mannequin Ivan Ivanovich, a dog named Zvezdochka ("Starlet", or "Little star"), frogs, monkeys, mice, rats, plants, television cameras and scientific apparatus.

== Background ==
A spacecraft of the design Vostok 3KA had only been launched once before, which was on March 9, 1961. This mission was called Korabl-Sputnik 4, and it was a complete success. Prior to Korabl-Sputnik 4, the two previous missions in the Vostok programme were both launched in December 1960, and both ended in failure.

Only days before the launch of Korabl-Sputnik 5, the cosmonaut team, which consisted of 20 men, experienced its first fatality. Cosmonaut candidate Valentin Bondarenko was killed in a fire during a training exercise in an oxygen-rich isolation chamber. It's not clear whether other cosmonauts were told of his death; the media didn't learn of Bondarenko's death - or even of his existence - until many years later, in 1986.

== Mission ==
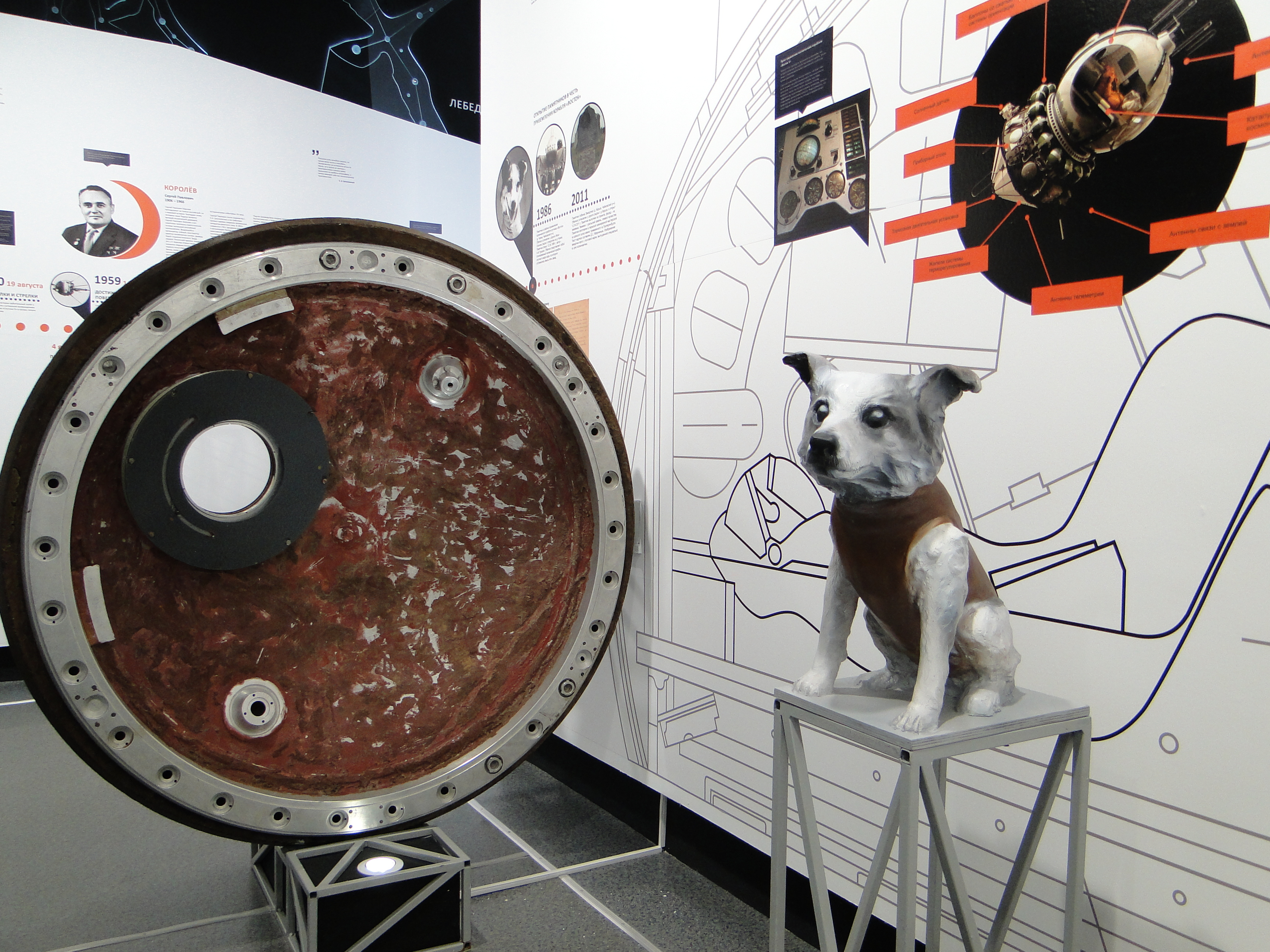
Hatch of the spacecraft in the Chaykovsky museum

Korabl-Sputnik 5 was launched at 05:54:00 UTC on 25 March 1961, atop a Vostok-K carrier rocket flying from Site 1/5 at the Baikonur Cosmodrome. It was successfully placed into low Earth orbit. As planned, the spacecraft completed a single orbit, and then reentered the atmosphere over the Soviet Union; the total flight time was approximately that of other single-orbit missions, so about 105 minutes. During the descent, the mannequin was ejected from the spacecraft in a successful test of its ejection seat, and descended separately under its own parachute, as it had done on the previous mission, Korabl-Sputnik 4. It landed at approximately 07:40 UTC, northeast of Izhevsk, near the Chaykovsky, Perm Krai.

=== Cosmonaut Communications Test/Hoax ===
The mannequin carried a tape recording to test communication systems. In an attempt to avoid independent radio operators mistakenly believing the capsule was crewed, and especially to avoid the Americans thinking it was a crewed satellite reconnaissance mission, the recordings contained intentional giveaways. These included a musical choir and a male voice reading out the recipe for borscht, an Eastern European beetroot soup, as though the cosmonaut was preparing it. Making soup would not have been possible in zero gravity, and the Soviets figured "even the most gullible Western intelligence man knew you couldn't fit a choir in a Korabl-Sputnik satellite." Nonetheless, non-Russian speaking listeners who tuned in to the radio transmissions did initially and erroneously believe that there was a cosmonaut aboard. Alexei Leonov would later recall: "since no announcement of the flight had been released by our state news agency, TASS, rumors spread like wildfire that a crewed space flight had gone wrong and been covered up."

=== Capsule recovery ===
The landing occurred during a snowstorm, which caused delays in locating exactly where touchdown occurred. It was about 24 hours after landing when a recovery team arrived at the site. Local villagers assisted the team to the landing area, with the help of a horse-drawn sled. The recovery team noted that the spacecraft was still hot to touch, 24 hours after landing in five feet of snow. The nearby villages were suspicious of the recovery teams, believing that the mannequin was in fact a person who may have been badly injured.

== Legacy ==
The success of Korabl-Sputnik 5 was the final step required to get approval for a crewed mission.

Vostok 3KA-2 was the key in the door for Gagarin's flight

— James Oberg, spaceflight researcher,

That crewed mission, known as Vostok 1, would occur on about April 12, 1961, carrying the world's first human space traveller, Yuri Gagarin. The spacecraft Gagarin used was a nearly identical model, called Vostok 3KA-3. A major difference between the 3KA-2 and 3KA-3 spacecraft was that the 3KA-2 version, like all uncrewed Vostok spacecraft, was equipped with a self-destruct system, in the event it reentered the atmosphere over foreign territory.

=== 2011 Auction ===
The re-entry module of the spacecraft Vostok 3KA-2 was auctioned at Sotheby's on 12 April 2011, the 50th anniversary of Gagarin's spaceflight, Vostok 1. The spacecraft was expected to sell for USD 2–10 million, and was sold for US$2,882,500.

=== 2020 COVID-19 Vaccine ===
On August 11, 2020 the Russian government announced the world's first release of a vaccine against COVID-19, referring to the vaccine as "Sputnik V" (Gam-COVID-Vac) to reflect Russia's previous victories in the Space Race.

== See also ==
- Zond 5, another Soviet mission some mistakenly thought was crewed.
