= Vostok 3 and 4 =

1962 Soviet human spaceflights into low Earth orbit

Vostok 3 / Vostok 4
- Vostok 3KA capsule
- Mission type: Low Earth orbital
- Operator: Soviet space program
- Harvard designation: Vostok 3: 1962 Alpha Mu 1; Vostok 4: 1962 Alpha Nu 1
- SATCAT no.: Vostok 3: 365; Vostok 4: 367
- Mission duration: Vostok 3: 3 days, 22 hours, 28 minutes; Vostok 4: 2 days, 22 hours, 56 minutes
- Orbits completed: Vostok 3: 64; Vostok 4: 48

Spacecraft properties
- Spacecraft: Vostok 3: 3KA No.5; Vostok 4: 3KA No. 6
- Manufacturer: Experimental Design Bureau OKB-1
- Launch mass: Vostok 3: 4,722 kilograms (10,410 lb); Vostok 4: 4,728 kilograms (10,423 lb)

Crew
- Crew size: 1
- Members: Vostok 3: Andriyan Nikolayev; Vostok 4: Pavel Popovich
- Callsign: Vostok 3: Сокол (Sokol – "Falcon"); Vostok 4: Беркут (Berkut - "Golden Eagle")

Start of mission
- Launch date: Vostok 3: August 11, 1962, 08:24 UTC; Vostok 4: August 12, 1962, 08:02:33 UTC
- Rocket: Vostok-K 8K72K
- Launch site: Baikonur 1/5

End of mission
- Landing date: Vostok 3: August 15, 1962, 06:52 UTC; Vostok 4: August 15, 1962, 06:59 UTC
- Landing site: Vostok 3: 42°2′N 75°45′E; Vostok 4: 48°9′N 71°51′E

Orbital parameters
- Reference system: Geocentric
- Regime: Low Earth
- Perigee altitude: Vostok 3: 166 kilometres (103 mi); Vostok 4: 169 kilometres (105 mi)
- Apogee altitude: Vostok 3: 218 kilometres (135 mi); Vostok 4: 222 kilometres (138 mi)
- Inclination: 65.0 degrees
- Period: 88.5 minutes
- Epoch: Vostok 3: 11 August 1962, 04:24:00 UTC; Vostok 4: 12 August 1962, 07:55:00 UTC
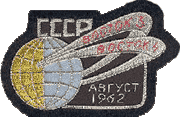
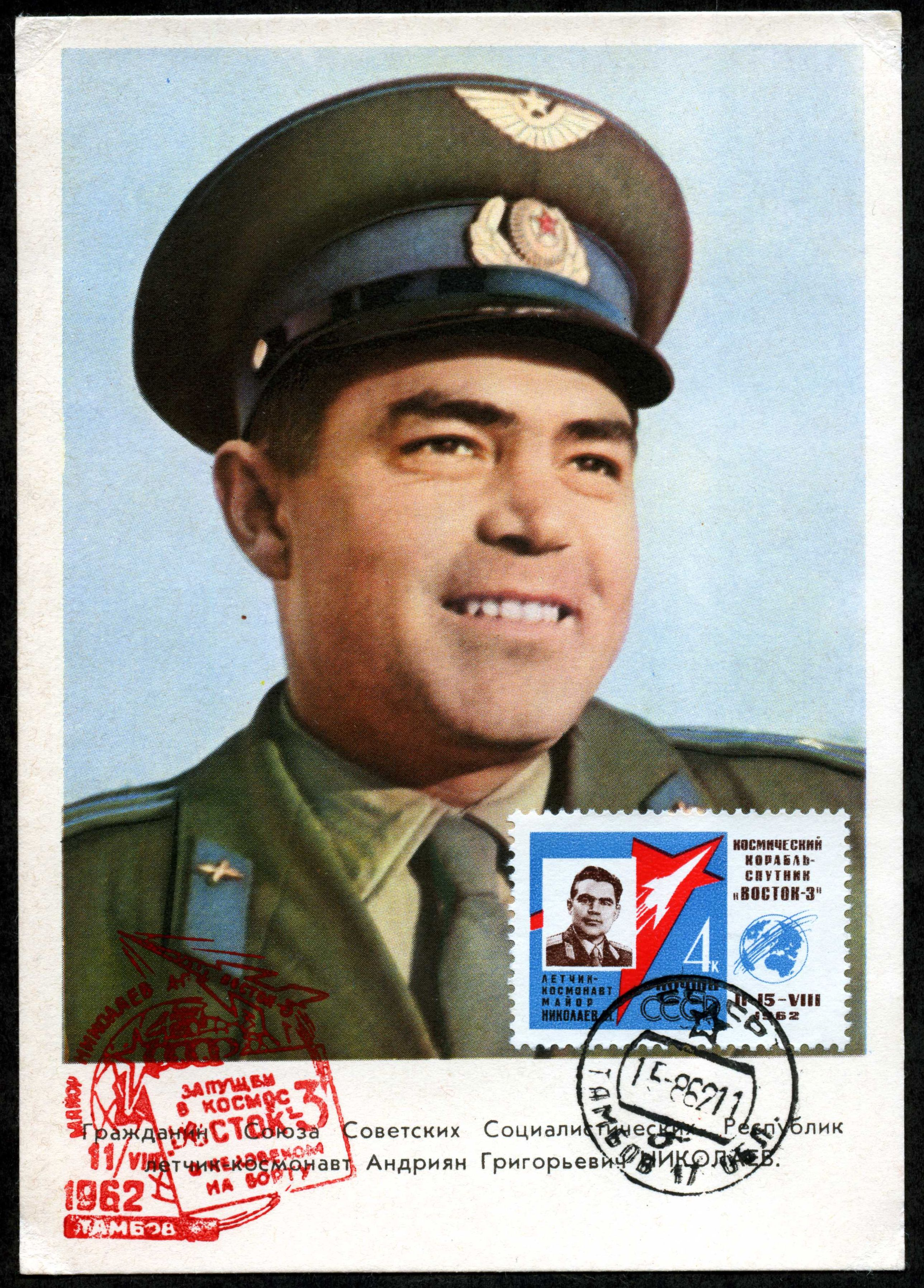
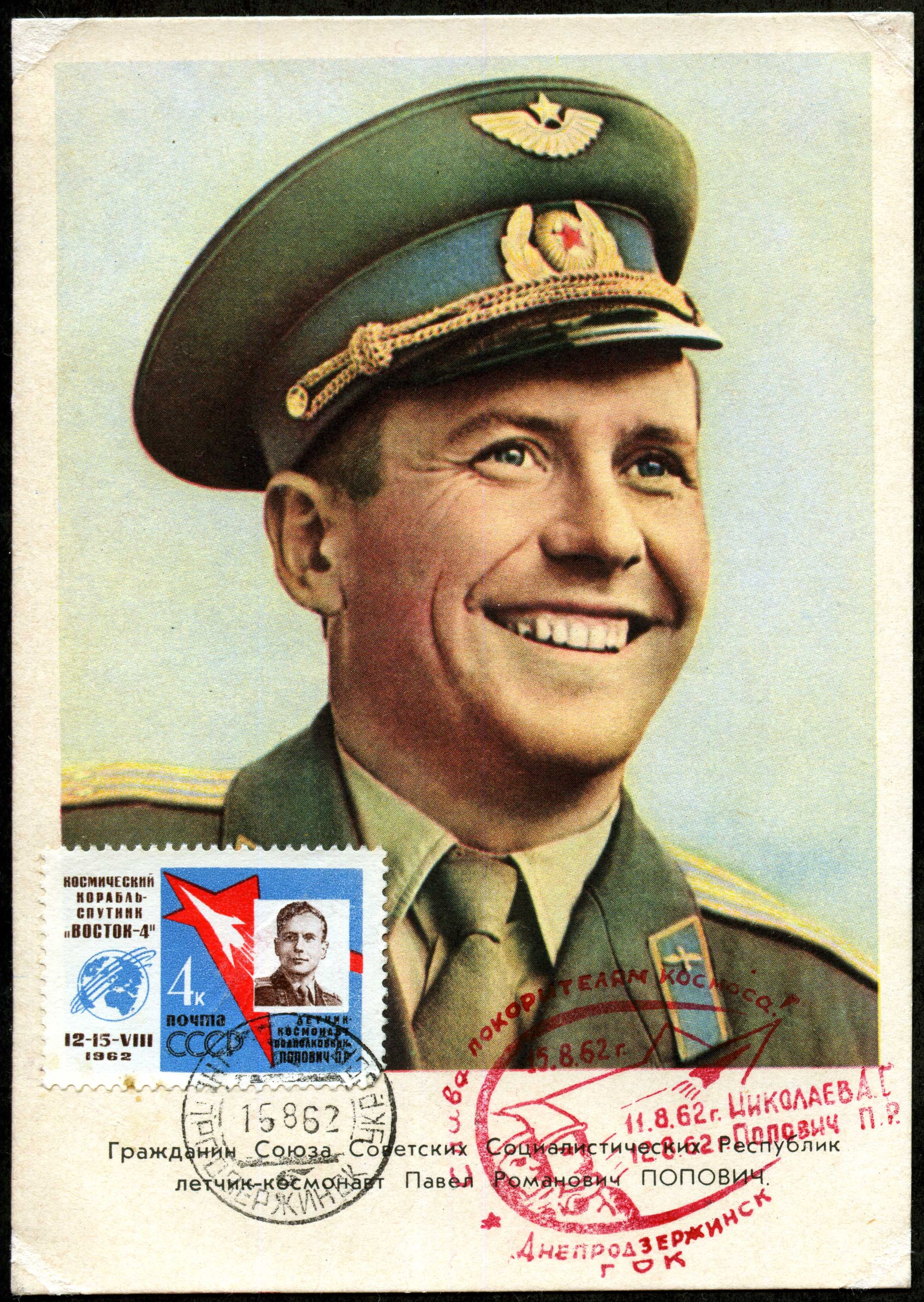
- Andryan G Nikolaiev / Pavel Popovich Vostok program

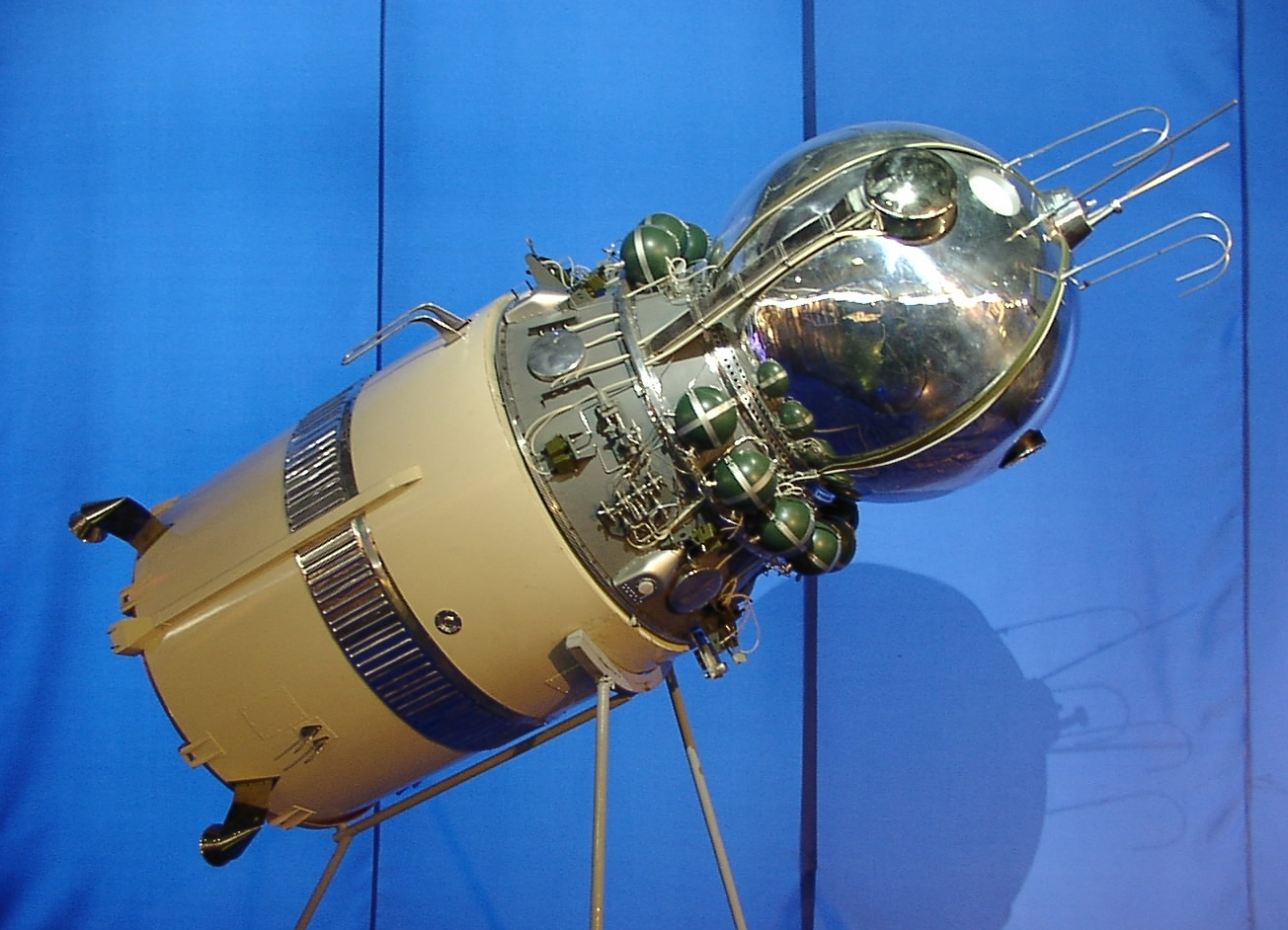
Model of the Vostok capsule with its carrier rocket's upper stage

Vostok 3 (Russian: Восток-3, lit. 'Orient 3' or 'East 3') and Vostok 4 (Восток-4, 'Orient 4' or 'East 4') were Soviet space program flights in August 1962, intended to determine the ability of the human body to function in conditions of weightlessness, test the ground control capability to launch and manage two separate, concurrent flights, and test the endurance of the Vostok 3KA spacecraft over longer flights. Cosmonaut Andriyan Nikolayev orbited the Earth 64 times in Vostok 3 over nearly four days in space, August 11–15, 1962, a feat which would not be matched by NASA until the Gemini program (1965–1966). Pavel Popovich was launched on Vostok 4 on August 12, and made 48 Earth orbits. The two capsules were launched on trajectories that brought the spacecraft within approximately 6.5 km (4.0 mi) of each another.

They also communicated with each other via radio, the first ship-to-ship communications in space. These missions marked the first time that more than one crewed spacecraft was in orbit at the same time, giving Soviet mission controllers the opportunity to learn to manage this scenario.

Although the two spacecraft were placed in very similar orbits (within 3-4 kilometers altitude), the Vostok did not possess the capability to achieve rendezvous. At one point they came within visual range of each other, and Popovich later reported at a news conference that he saw the other craft from orbit. Popovich is quoted as saying, "I saw it at once," referring to seeing Vostok 3 in orbit. "It looked like a very small moon in the distance."

Vostok 4 went largely as planned, despite a malfunction with the Vostok's life-support systems that caused cabin temperature to drop to 10 °C (50 °F). The flight was terminated early after a misunderstanding by ground control, who believed that Popovich had given them a codeword asking to be brought back ahead of schedule.

The two spacecraft landed seven minutes and about 200 km apart, south of Karaganda, Kazakhstan.

== Vostok 3 ==
Position	Crew
Pilot	Andrian G. Nikolayev; First spaceflight

=== Backup ===
Position	Crew
Pilot	Boris Volynov

=== Reserve ===
Position	Crew
Pilot	Valery Bykovsky

== Vostok 4 ==
Position	Crew
Pilot	Pavel Popovich; First spaceflight

=== Backup ===
Position	Crew
Pilot	Vladimir M. Komarov

=== Reserve ===
Position	Crew
Pilot	Boris Volynov

== Mission parameters ==
- Mass: 4,722 kg (10,410 lb)
- Perigee: 166 km (103 mi)
- Apogee: 218 km (135 mi)
- Inclination: 65.0°
- Period: 88.5 minutes

== Background ==
Gherman Titov had suffered space sickness during his record-breaking one-day mission aboard Vostok 2. This condition was unknown at the time, leading Soviet scientists to devote efforts to study the effect of spaceflight on the human body.

In 1961, Soviet rocket engineer Sergei Korolev pushed for a three-day spaceflight as a follow-up to Vostok 2. Such a mission was opposed by the head of cosmonaut training Nikolai Kamanin and the cosmonauts themselves, who were concerned about unforeseen health effects that might result from extending space flights too quickly. Plans for a three-day mission only went forward when the approval of Soviet Premier Nikita Khrushchev was obtained; in the end, Vostok 3 would last nearly four days.

One objective of the missions of Vostok 3 and Vostok 4 was the study of how the reactions of Nikolayev and Pavel Popovich might differ during a series of tests under similar circumstances. The close orbits of the two spacecraft would keep the number of variables to a minimum, allowing the measurement of individual differences in adaptation to spaceflight. The Vostok spacecraft were upgraded to increase the volume of information collected about the flight conditions and the crew.

Training was expanded to condition cosmonauts against space sickness and select those candidate spacefarers deemed least susceptible. Informed by Titov's experience in Vostok 2, Nikolayev and Popovich thoroughly rehearsed their spacecraft maneuvers and other planned activities in a simulator.

The Vostok 3/4 flights were originally scheduled for November 1961, which would have had the propaganda value of the Soviet program having flown four men in space along with a dual mission in the same calendar year when the United States had yet to orbit a single man, but Korolev's plans were frustrated by the Zenit photo reconnaissance satellite program which needed to use the R-7 pads at Baikonur. He then suggested launching at the end of December or the start of January, but Chief of Cosmonaut Training Nikolai Kamanin and the State Planning Commission opposed launching in the wintertime due to harsh weather conditions and instead suggested waiting until March.

The first Zenit launch took place on 11 December, but the Blok E stage malfunctioned and the satellite was destroyed. Since this was the same model of booster used by the Vostok (8K72K), it was a concern for the program. While engineers attempted to resolve the problem, Vostok 3/4's mission was pushed back a month to April. However, further delays happened when the second Zenit satellite (Kosmos 4) experienced problems with its orientation system, necessitating another test and further delays.

On 1 June, an attempted launch of a Zenit photo reconnaissance satellite ended with the booster crashing near the pad. One of the strap-ons had also fallen back onto LC-1 and burned, resulting in extensive damage that took over a month to repair. By mid-July, the pad had been restored to use, but another delay occurred when the United States carried out a high-altitude nuclear test on 9 July known as Starfish Prime. The test had unexpected consequences in that it released high levels of radiation into the upper atmosphere and space, knocking out several satellites and making any crewed space launch unsafe for at least a month. By the second week of August, radiation levels had diminished enough that the Vostok 3/4 mission could go ahead.

The Zenit launch accident had occurred in a new, uprated version of the R-7 launch vehicle (the 8A92) while the Vostok used the older 8K72K booster, so it was not a direct concern for the program. However, just to be cautious, it was decided to fly an additional Zenit satellite to verify the reliability of the R-7. In addition, since the Zenit satellite was essentially a modified Vostok, the flight doubled as an engineering test of certain Vostok components. This was done successfully on July 28, after which preparations at LC-1 began for Vostok 3.

== Mission highlights ==
Vostok 3 lifted off from Gagarin's Start at Baikonur Cosmodrome on August 11, 1962 at 08:24 UTC atop a Vostok 8K72K rocket. During his first day in orbit, Nikolayev unstrapped himself from his seat and became the first spacefarer to float freely in conditions of microgravity in space.

Nikolayev's orbital companion Popovich was launched the next day aboard Vostok 4. The former adjusted his spacecraft's orientation to watch the launch, but failed to see anything despite reporting considerable details on the ground as he had passed over Turkey. Data on the two spacecraft's orbital parameters that were released periodically by Soviet news agency TASS seemed to indicate a change in Vostok 3's orbital trajectory within ten hours of Vostok 4's launch, leading to speculation that the former spacecraft modified its orbit to bring it closer to that of the latter. The Vostok spacecraft is not believed to have had the ability to modify its orbit. Plans were for the spacecraft to approach to 5 km (3.1 mi), but the closest distance achieved was 6.5 km (4.0 mi). At the start of Vostok 3's thirty-third orbit, this distance had diverged to 850 km (530 mi), and to 2,850 km (1,770 mi) at the start of the 64th.

Nikolayev and Popovich made contact with one another via shortwave radio soon after their spacecraft approached one another; they would maintain regular ship-to-ship communications over the course of their mission in addition to their contact with the ground. Nikolayev reported sighting the Vostok 4 capsule after it entered orbit near him.

The mission led Western observers to speculate that the Soviets must already have spacecraft capable of in-orbit maneuvering. Official press releases naturally made no mention that the Vostok spacecraft lacked this ability or that the two Vostoks were able to attain such close approach due to their extremely precise launches.

Both Nikolayev and Popovich spent time out of their seats each day, conducting a series of tests to determine their ability to maneuver and work in conditions of weightlessness. Each test was said to last "about one hour." The physical and mental state of the cosmonauts were monitored: biometric sensors relayed the cosmonauts' vital statistics to the ground; the cosmonauts' behavior and coordination was observed via a cabin-mounted video camera; and the cosmonauts' ability to perform various operations in coordination with ground controllers was considered. The cosmonauts' speech was monitored both by controllers on the ground and one another. The results of the tests were deemed positive, evidence of the ability of humans to function and work over longer periods in microgravity. Nikolayev also spoke with Soviet Premier Nikita Khrushchev over the radio, but interference was so bad that he couldn't hear most of the conversation.

Attention was paid to the cosmonauts' ability to sleep, and their vital signs were monitored during their sleep periods. Nikolayev reported that he slept well, but always woke after only six hours of his scheduled eight-hour sleep period, feeling "refreshed".

Nikolayev fired his retrorocket pack and returned to Earth on August 15, 1962, landing at 06:52 UTC at 42°2′N 75°45′E, near Karaganda. As with Titov on Vostok 2—but unlike Gagarin on Vostok 1—Nikolayev would admit to reporters that he ejected and parachuted to Earth separately from his spacecraft.

== Spacecraft location ==
The re-entry capsule is now on display at the NPO Zvezda Museum in Moscow, but it has been modified to represent the Voskhod 2 capsule.
