= Vostok-2 =

Vostok-2 may refer to:

- Vostok 2, Soviet crewed spaceflight
- Vostok-2 (rocket), Soviet rocket
