= Ivan Ivanovich (Vostok programme) =

Mannequin used in testing spacecraft

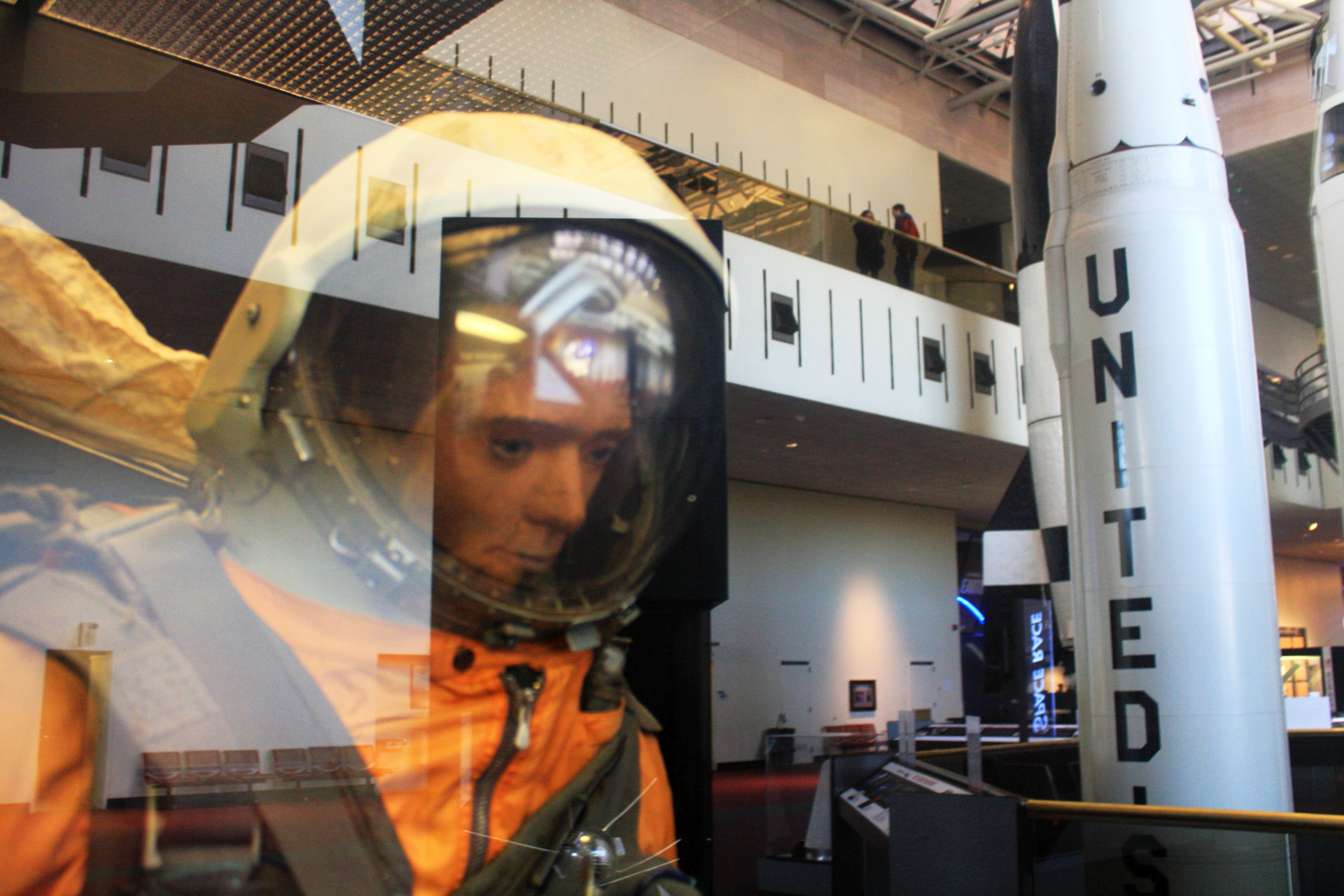
Ivan Ivanovich on display at the National Air and Space Museum in 2013

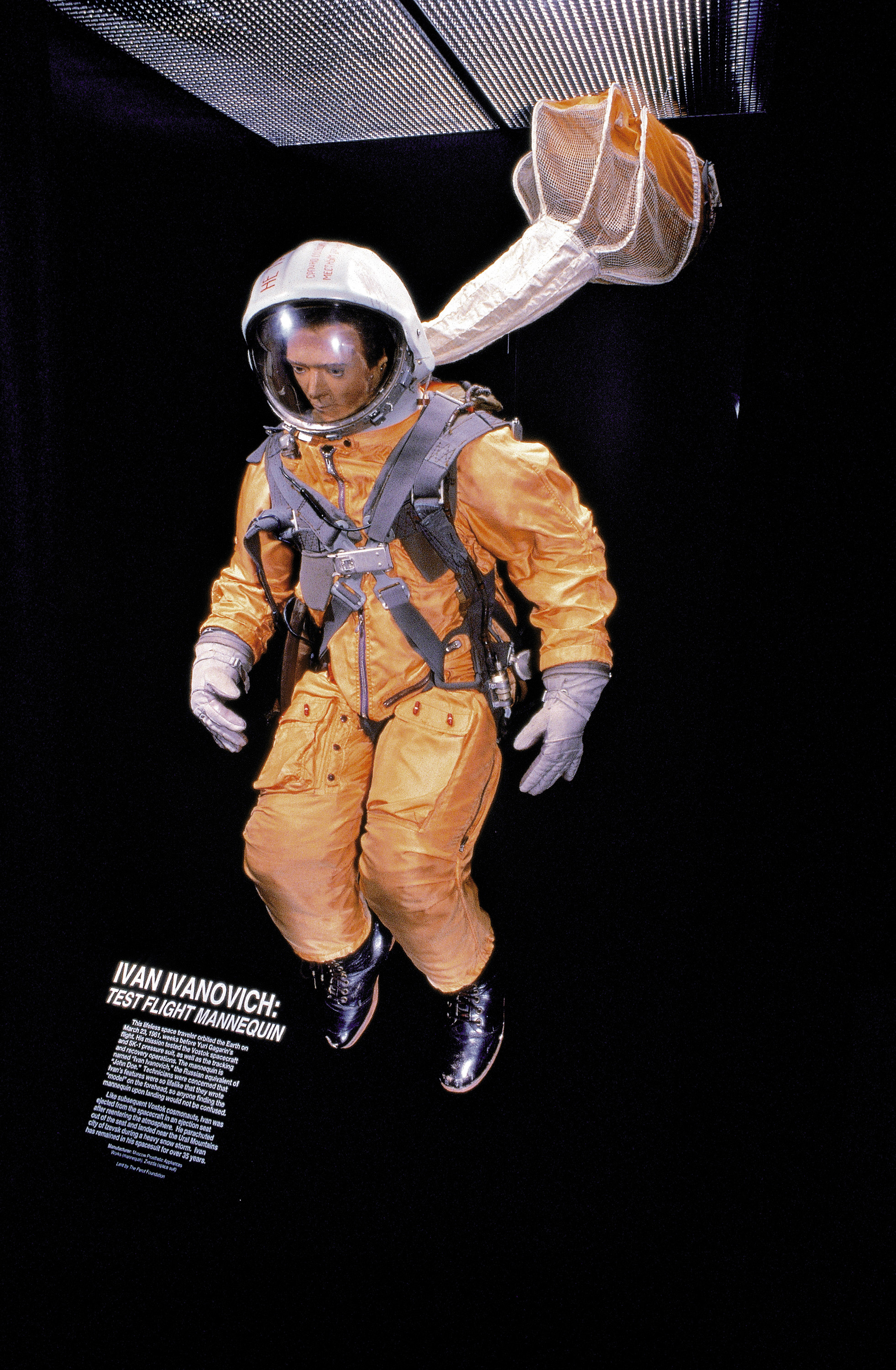
Full Ivan Ivanovich display

Ivan Ivanovich (Иван Иванович, the Russian equivalent of "John Doe") was the name given to a mannequin used in testing the Soviet Vostok spacecraft in preparation for its crewed missions.

Ivan Ivanovich was made to look as lifelike as possible, with eyes, eyebrows, eyelashes, and a mouth. He was dressed in a cosmonaut suit and strongly resembled a dead person; for this reason, a sign reading "МАКЕТ" (Russian for "dummy") was placed under his visor so that anyone who found him after his missions would not think he was a corpse or an alien.

== First spaceflight ==
Ivan first flew into space on Korabl-Sputnik 4 on 9 March 1961, accompanied by a dog named Chernushka, various reptiles, and 80 mice and guinea pigs, some of which were placed inside his body. To test the spacecraft's communication systems, an automatic recording of a choir was placed in Ivan's body – this way, any radio stations who heard the recording would understand it was not a real person. Ivan was also used to test the landing system upon return to Earth, when he was successfully ejected from the capsule and parachuted to the ground.

His second space flight, Korabl-Sputnik 5, on 25 March 1961, was similar – he was again accompanied by a dog, Zvyozdochka, and other animals, which include guinea pigs, frogs, monkeys, mice, rats, and flies. He had a recording of a choir (and also a recipe for beetroot soup) inside him, and he safely returned to Earth. These flights paved the way for Vostok 1, the first crewed flight into space on 12 April 1961.

== Other uses ==
In 1993, Ivan was auctioned at Sotheby's, with the winning bid coming from a foundation belonging to US businessman Ross Perot. He fetched $189,500. Since 1997, he has been on loan to the National Air and Space Museum, where he was on display, still in his spacesuit, until 2017 when he was moved back into the private collection of Ross Perot.

In 2006, the name Ivan Ivanovich was used as a nickname for SuitSat-1, a satellite made from a disused spacesuit, ejected from the International Space Station.
