= Soviet space dogs =

Soviet-era program that sent dogs to space

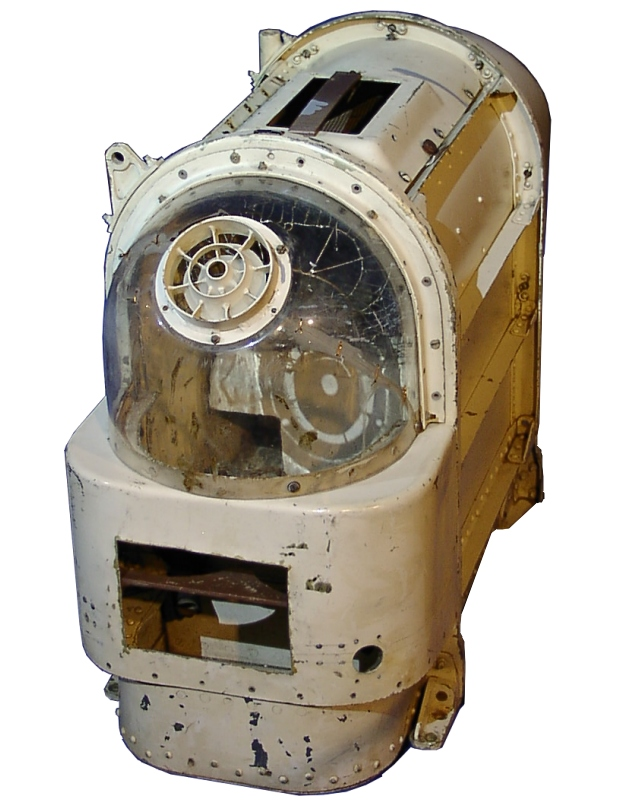
Original Soviet space dog environmentally controlled safety module used on sub-orbital and orbital spaceflights

In the 1950s and 1960s, the Soviet space program used dogs for suborbital and orbital space flights as proof-of-concept to determine whether human spaceflight was feasible. The Soviet space program typically used female dogs due to their anatomical compatibility with the spacesuit. Similarly, they used mix-breed dogs due to their apparent hardiness.

During this period, the Soviet Union launched missions with passenger slots for numerous dogs. Some dogs flew more than once. Many missions were successful, but some resulted in fatalities, including Laika, the first animal to orbit Earth, who on 3 November 1957 was sent on a one-way orbital mission aboard Sputnik 2.

== Training ==
Dogs were the preferred animal for the experiments because scientists felt dogs were well suited to endure long periods of inactivity. As part of their training, they were confined in small boxes for 15–20 days at a time. Stray dogs, rather than animals accustomed to living in a house, were chosen because the scientists felt they would be able to tolerate the rigors and extreme stresses of space flight better than other dogs. Female dogs were preferred because of their temperament, and because the suit the dogs wore in order to collect urine and feces was equipped with a special device designed to work only with females.

Their training included being placed in pressure chambers, riding in centrifuges designed to mimic the high acceleration of the rocket's powered stage, and being kept in small enclosures for extended periods of time to prepare them for the confines of the capsule. In preparation for orbital flights, a special jelly-like food, consisting of breadcrumbs, powdered meat, and beef fat was created for the dogs.

== Suborbital flights ==
Dogs were flown to an altitude of 100 km (62 mi) on board 15 scientific flights on R-1 rockets (itself a copy of the German V-2) from 1951 to 1956. The dogs wore pressure suits with acrylic glass bubble helmets. From 1957 to 1960, 11 flights with dogs were made on the R-2A series (developed from the R-1 missile) which flew to about 200 km (120 mi). Three flights were made to an altitude of about 450 km (280 mi) on R-5A rockets in 1958. In the R-2 and R-5 rockets, the dogs were contained in a pressured cabin.

=== Dezik, Tsygan, and Lisa ===
Dezik (Дезик) and Tsygan (Цыган, 'Gypsy',) were the first dogs to make a suborbital flight and were successfully recovered on 22 July 1951. Both dogs were recovered unharmed after travelling to a maximum altitude of 110 km (68 mi). Dezik made another suborbital flight on 29 July 1951 with a dog named Lisa (Лиса, 'Fox'), although neither survived because the parachute failed to deploy. After the death of Dezik, Tsygan was adopted as a pet by Soviet physicist Anatoli Blagonravov.

=== Smelaya and Ryzhik ===
Smelaya (Смелая, "Brave" or "Courageous") made a flight with a dog named Ryzhik (Рыжик, "Ginger") on 19 August 1951, and both dogs returned safely.

Smelaya ran away the day before the launch, but came back the next morning and was prepared for the flight. She then flew and was safely recovered.

=== Bobik, ZIB, and Neputevyy ===
Bobik (Бобик, common Russian name for a small dog) was scheduled to take part in a flight on 3 September 1951, along with a dog named Neputevyy (Непутёвый, "Scamp"). Bobik ran away during a walk before the flight, but a replacement named ZIB (ЗИБ, a Russian acronym for "Substitute for Missing Bobik", "Замена Исчезнувшему Бобику" Zamena Ischeznuvshemu Bobiku), who was an untrained street dog found running around the base, was quickly located, prepared, and made a successful flight.

ZIB and Neputevyy's flight took place on 3 September 1951, and both dogs were recovered safely. ZIB was later adopted by Anatoli Blagonravov and lived in retirement with Tsygan.

=== Otvazhnaya, Snezhinka, and Palma-2 ===
Otvazhnaya (Отважная, "Brave One") made two flights on 2 and 10 July 1959 along with a dog named Snezhinka (Снежинка, "Snowflake"). Snezhinka was renamed Zhemchuzhnaya (Жемчужная, "Pearly") after the first flight.

Otvazhnaya also made two flights with another dog, Palma-2 (Пальма, "Palm"), on 2 and 13 August 1958. She was also known as Kusachka (Кусачка, "Biter"), and was given the name Otvazhnaya after her fourth flight. She made at least five flights between 1958-1960, all of which resulted in safe recovery of the animals.

=== Albina and Kozyavka ===
Albina (Альбина) and Kozyavka (Козявка "Little Gnat") made 2 flights on 7 and 14 June 1956, and were safely recovered both times. Albina was one of the three dogs shortlisted for Sputnik 2 as a backup due to her experience, but she never flew in orbit.

=== Shutka and Kometa ===
Shutka (Шутка, "Joke") and Kometa (Кометка, "Comet"), along with mice and other small animals, were launched on 22 December 1960 and were to make an orbital flight as a part of the Vostok programme. However their mission was marked by a string of equipment failures.

The spacecraft did not reach orbit due to a malfunction of the rocket's third stage. The capsule followed a ballistic trajectory and landed in Siberia after being separated by the emergency escape system at 133 mi (214 km). The spacecraft was equipped with a self-destruct mechanism, but it failed to activate. The capsule appeared to have landed safely, but the self-destruct mechanism, which could be triggered by an off-course trajectory, could also be set off by a 60-hour timer, leaving the dogs in danger. A team was quickly sent out to locate and recover the capsule. Upon arrival at the landing site, it was discovered that the capsule containing the dogs remained stuck inside the main spacecraft. A synchronization mistake caused the hatch and the ejection rockets to trigger simultaneously, which resulted in the mechanism jamming and failing to eject the capsule.

Although the capsule was reached in deep snow on the first day, there was insufficient remaining daylight to disarm the self-destruct mechanism and open the capsule. The team could only report that the window was frosted over in the −43 °C (−45 °F) degree temperatures and no signs of life were detected. On the second day, however, the dogs were heard barking as the capsule was opened. The dogs were wrapped in sheepskin coats and flown to Moscow alive, though the mice and other small animals aboard the capsule were found dead because of the cold.

Shutka was also known as Damka (Дамка, "Queen of Checkers") and Zhemchuzhina (Жемчужина, "Pearl"); Kometa was also known as Krasavka (Красавка, "Little Beauty" or "Belladonna"), Zhulka (Жулька), Zhemchuzhnaya (Жемчужная, "Pearly") and Snezhinka (Снежинка, "Snowflake"). After this incident Kometa was adopted by Oleg Gazenko, a leading Soviet scientist working with animals used in space flights. She went on to have puppies and continued living with Gazenko and his family until her death 14 years later.

=== Chaika and Lisichka ===
Chaika (Чайка, "Seagull"), also referred to as Bars (Барс, "Snow Leopard"), and another dog named Lisichka (Лисичка, "Little Fox") were also on a mission to orbit as a part of the Vostok programme, but died after their rocket exploded during launch on 28 July 1960.

=== Other suborbital flights ===
| No. | Date | Dogs (Note: Numerical suffixes appear next to some names. This column follows one source in which they are used systematically; other sources generally omit them or use them inconsistently.) | Outcome | Ref. |
|---|---|---|---|---|
| 1 | 15 and 28 August 1951 (2 flights) | Mishka (Мишка, "Little Bear"), Chizhik (Чижик, "Siskin") | Recovered safely on the first flight; second flight failed, both dogs died | |
| 2 | 26 June 1954 | Lisa-2, Ryzhik-2 | Recovered safely | |
| 3 | 2 July 1954 | Mishka-2, Damka | Recovered safely, Mishka-2 died | |
| 4 | 7 July 1954 | Ryzhik-2, Damka | Recovered safely, Ryzhik-2 died | |
| 5 | 26 July 1954 | Ryzhik-3, Lisa-2 | Recovered safely | |
| 6 | 25 January (or June) 1955 | Linda (Линда) or Lisa-2, Rita (Рита) | Recovered safely, Rita died | |
| 7 | 5 February 1955 | Lisa-2, Bulba (Бульба) | Both dogs died (recovery failed) | |
| 8 | 4 November 1955 | Malyshka (Малышка, "Little One"), Knopka (Кнопка, "Button") | Recovered safely after 3 days | |
| 9 | 14 May 1956 | Kozyavka, Albina | Recovered safely | |
| 10 | 31 May 1956 | Malyshka, Linda | Recovered safely | |
| 11 | 16 May 1957 | Ryzhaya (Рыжая, "Redhead"), Damka-2 | Recovered safely | |
| 12 | 24 May 1957 | Ryzhaya, Dzhoyna (Джойна) | Both dogs died (cabin decompression) | |
| 13 | 25 August 1957 | Modnitsa (Модница, "Fashionable"), Belka (Белка, "Squirrel") | Recovered safely | |
| 14 | 31 August 1957 | Damka-2, Belka | Recovered safely | |
| 15 | 6 September 1957 | Modnitsa, Belka | Recovered safely | |
| 16 | 21 February 1958 | Pushok (Пушок, "Fluffy"), Palma (Пальма) | Both dogs died (cabin decompression) | |
| 17 | 27 August 1958 | Pestraya (Пестрая, "Spotted"), Belyanka (Белянка, "Little White One") | Recovered safely | |
| 18 | 19 September 1958 | Kozyavka, Damka-2 | Recovered safely | |
| 19 | 31 October 1958 | Zhulba (Жульба), Knopka | Both dogs died (parachute failure) | |
| 20 | 15 June 1960 | Otvazhnaya, Malyok (Малёк, "Small Fry") | Recovered safely | |
| 21 | 24 June 1960 | Otvazhnaya, Zhemchuzhnaya | Recovered safely; Otvazhnaya may not have participated in this flight | |
| 22 | 16 September 1960 | Palma-2, Malyok | Recovered safely | |
| 23 | 22 September 1960 | Neva (Нева), Otvazhnaya | Recovered safely; Otvazhnaya may not have participated in this flight | |

== Orbital flights ==
=== Laika ===
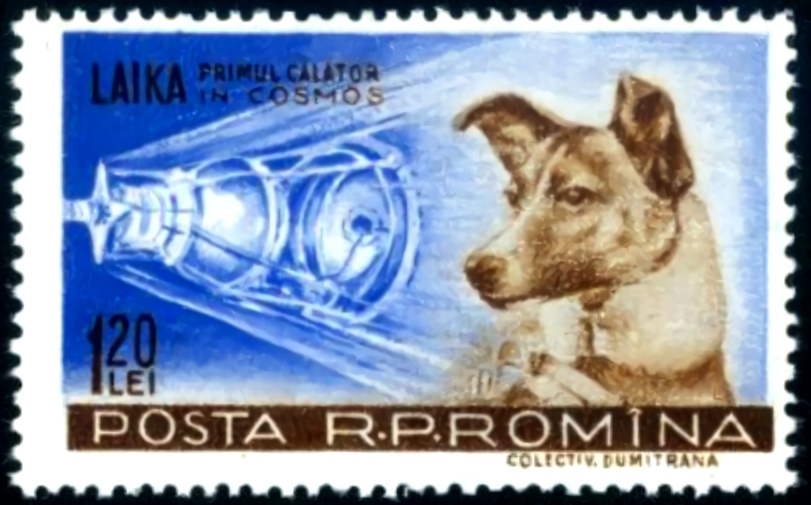
Laika on a Romanian post stamp

On 3 November 1957, Laika (Лайка, "Barker") flew to space on Sputnik 2 to become the first Earth-born creature to orbit the planet. The mission had no recovery plan to bring her back to Earth alive. Laika was also known as Kudryavka (Кудрявка, "Little Curly"), Zhuchka (Жучка, "Little Bug") and Limonchik (Лимончик, "Little Lemon"). The American media dubbed her "Muttnik", making a play on words for the canine follow-on to the first orbital mission, Sputnik. She died between five and seven hours into the flight from stress and overheating.

Laika's true cause of death was not made public until October 2002; officials previously gave reports that she died when the oxygen supply ran out. At a Moscow press conference in 1998 Oleg Gazenko, a senior Soviet scientist involved in the project, stated "The more time passes, the more I'm sorry about it. We did not learn enough from the mission to justify the death of the dog...".

=== Belka and Strelka ===
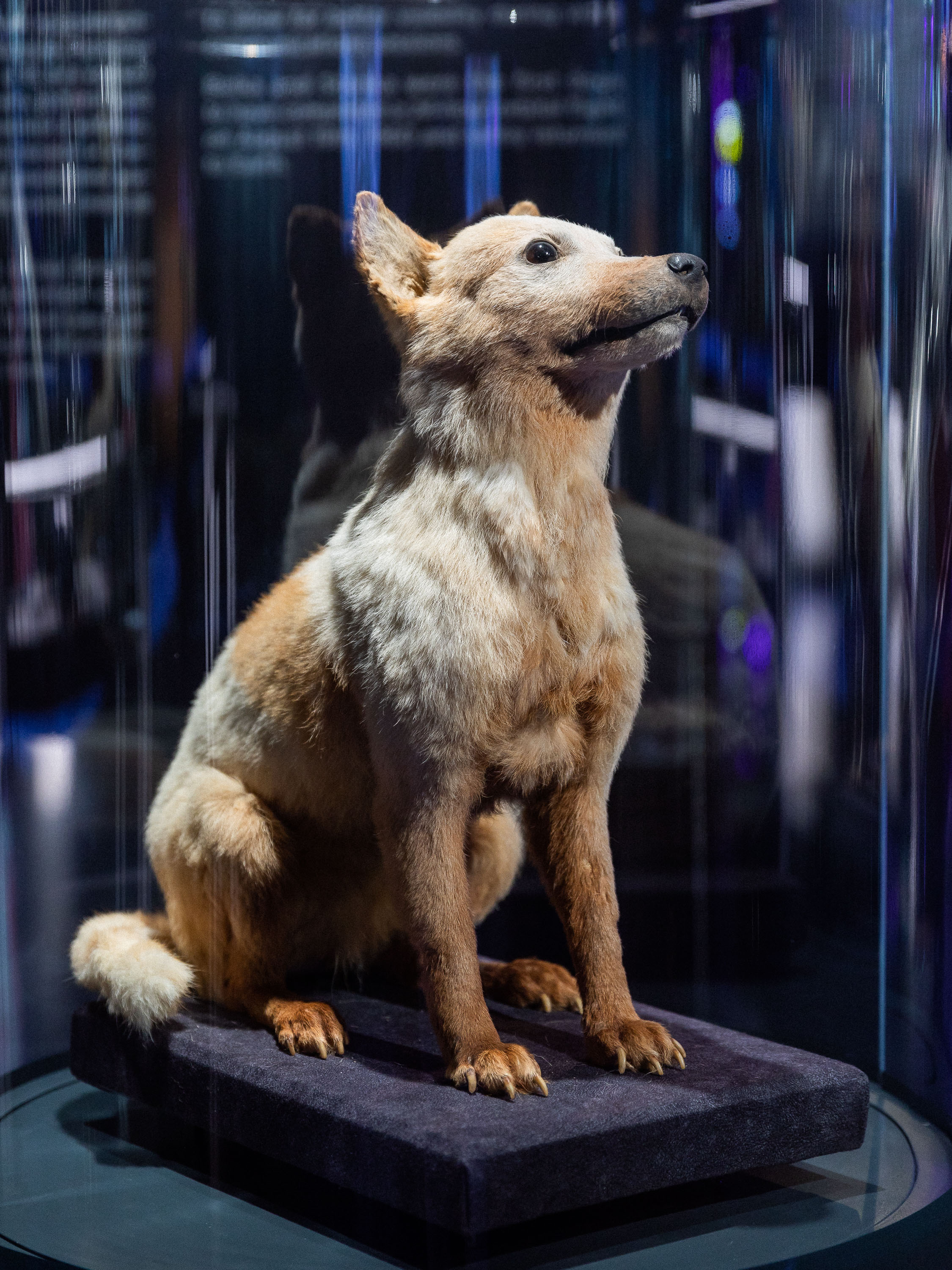
Belka

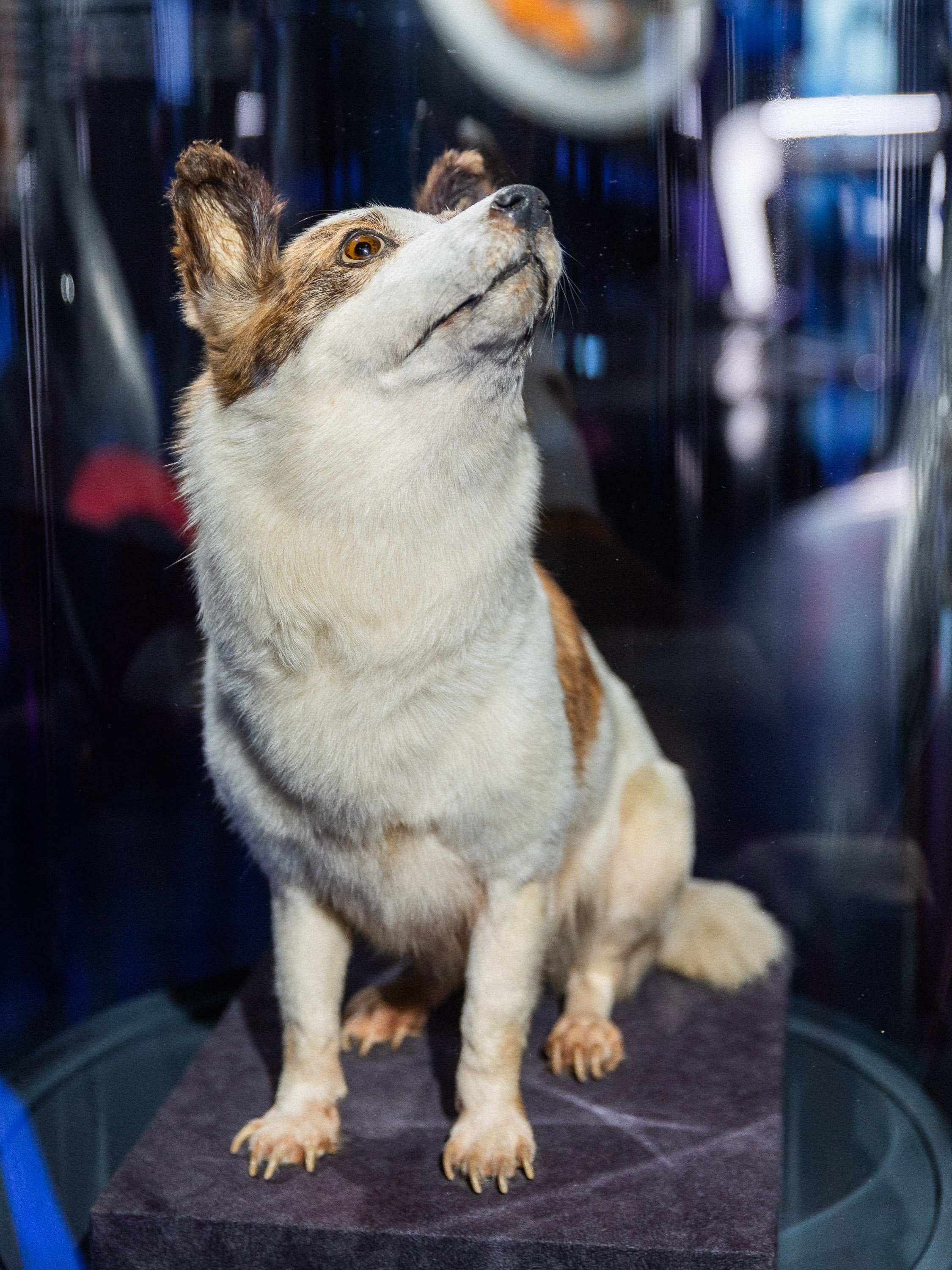
Strelka

Belka (Белка, literally, "Squirrel", or alternatively "Whitey") and Strelka (Стрелка, "Little Arrow") were launched on 19 August 1960 and spent a day in orbit aboard Korabl-Sputnik 2 (Sputnik 5) before safely returning to Earth.

They were accompanied by a grey rabbit, 42 mice, two rats, flies and several plants and fungi. All passengers survived. They were the first Earth-born creatures to go into orbit and return alive, and gave birth to many descendants.

=== Pchyolka and Mushka ===
Pchyolka (Пчёлка, "Little Bee") and Mushka (Мушка, "Little Fly") were launched on 1 December 1960 and spent a day in orbit on board Korabl-Sputnik-3 (Sputnik 6) with "other animals", plants and insects. Due to a reentry error when the retrorockets failed to shut off when planned, their spacecraft was intentionally destroyed by remote self-destruct to prevent foreign powers from inspecting the capsule. Both dogs died in the capsule's destruction.

Mushka was one of the three dogs trained for Sputnik 2 and was used during ground tests.

=== Chernushka ===
Chernushka (Чернушка, "Blackie") made one orbit on board Korabl-Sputnik-4 (Sputnik 9) on 9 March 1961 with a cosmonaut dummy (whom Soviet officials nicknamed Ivan Ivanovich), mice, guinea pigs, and other biological material. The dummy was ejected out of the capsule during re-entry and made a soft landing using a parachute. Chernushka was recovered safely inside the capsule.

=== Zvyozdochka ===
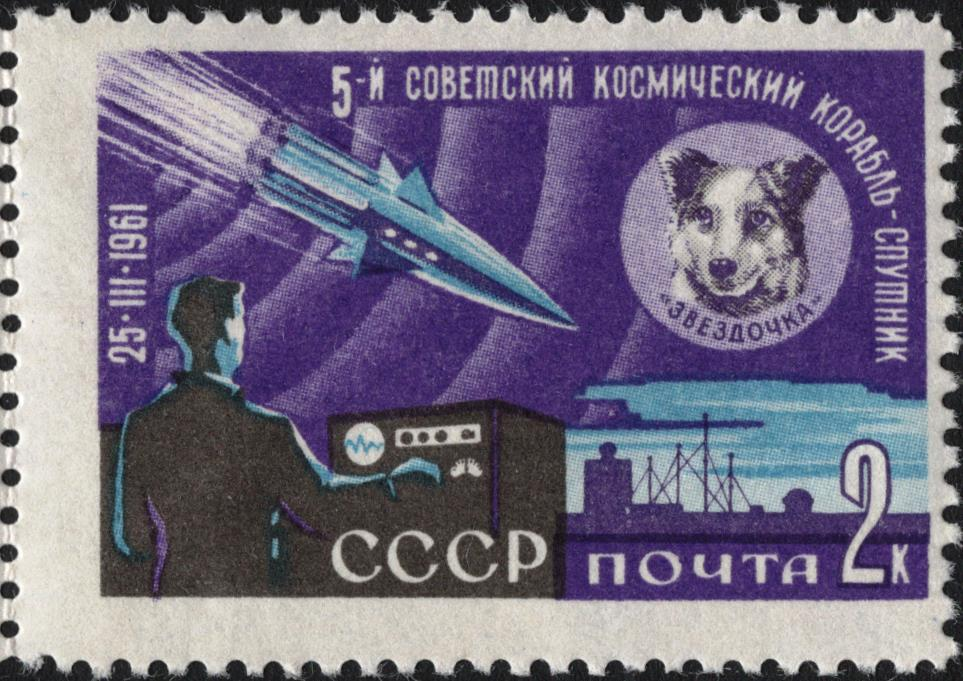
Zvyozdochka on a 1961 stamp

Zvyozdochka (Zvezdochka, Звёздочка, "Starlet"), who was named by Yuri Gagarin, made one orbit on board Korabl-Sputnik 5 on 25 March 1961 with a wooden cosmonaut dummy, and other animals in the final practice flight before Gagarin's historic flight on 12 April. Again, the dummy was ejected out of the capsule while Zvezdochka remained inside. Both were recovered successfully.

=== Veterok and Ugolyok ===
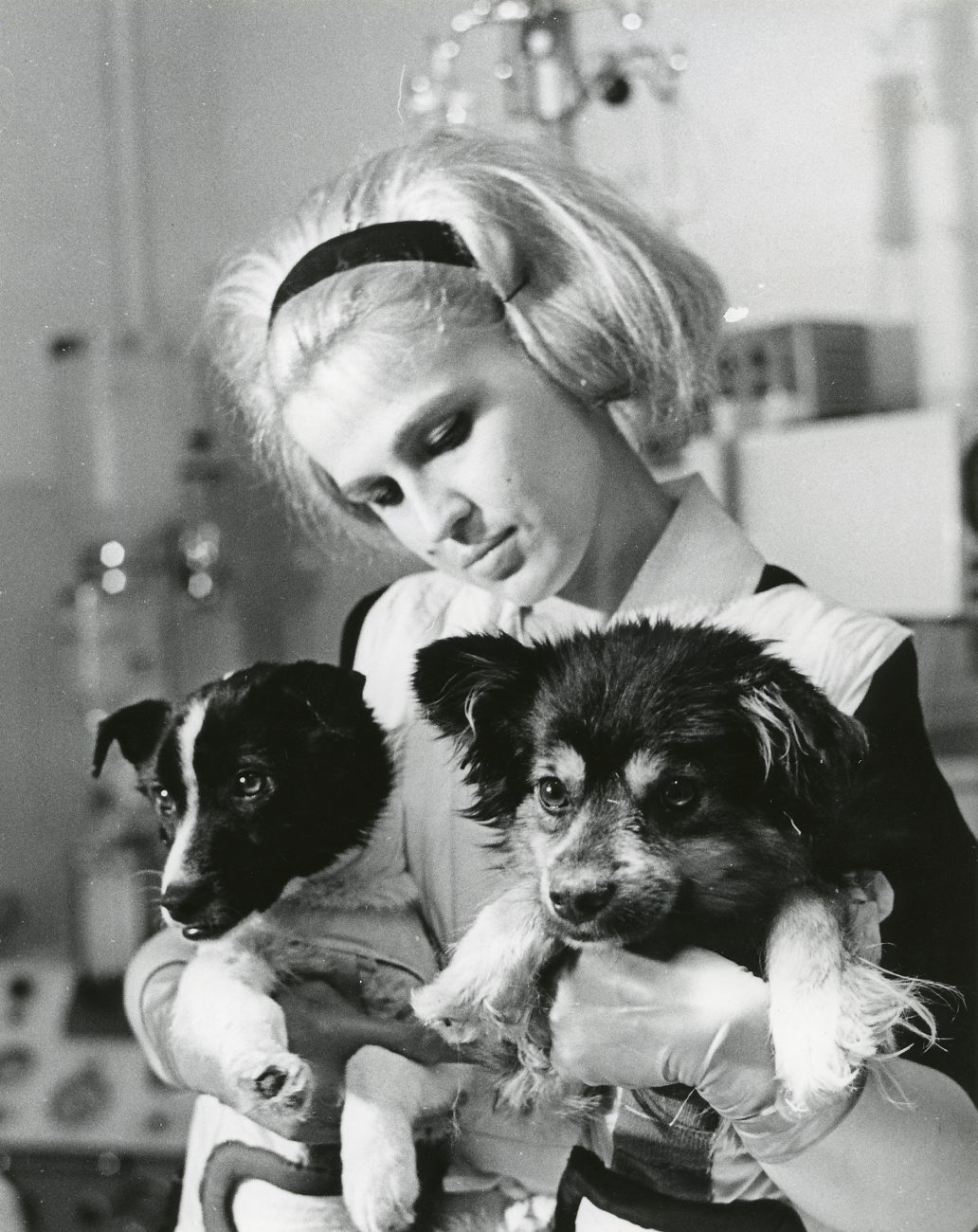
Space dogs Veterok and Ugolyok

Veterok (Ветерок, "Light Breeze") and Ugolyok (Уголёк, "Ember") were launched on 22 February 1966 on board Kosmos 110, and were recovered on 16 March after a 22-day orbital mission. This spaceflight of record-breaking duration was not surpassed until Soyuz 11 in June 1971 and still stands as the longest orbital flight by dogs. The two dogs showed signs of "cardiovascular deconditioning" with dehydration, weight loss, loss of muscle and coordination and took several weeks to fully recover, though they showed no long-term issues.

== See also ==
- Animals in space
- Cosmo the Spacedog (comics)
- Félicette, first cat in space
- List of individual dogs
- Monkeys and non-human apes in space
- Sputnik program
- Voskhod program
