= Korabl-Sputnik 3 =

Soviet spacecraft

- Names: Sputnik 6
- Mission type: Biological; Technology
- Operator: Soviet space program
- Harvard designation: 1960 Rho 1
- COSPAR ID: 1960-017A
- SATCAT no.: 65
- Mission duration: 25 hours, 42 minutes

Spacecraft properties
- Spacecraft type: Vostok-1K
- Manufacturer: OKB-1
- Launch mass: 4,563 kilograms (10,060 lb)

Start of mission
- Launch date: 1 December 1960, 07:30:04 UTC
- Rocket: Vostok-L 8K72
- Launch site: Baikonur 1/5

End of mission
- Disposal: Deorbited off-course Self-destructed
- Decay date: 2 December 1960

Orbital parameters
- Reference system: Geocentric
- Regime: Low Earth
- Eccentricity: 0.00501
- Perigee altitude: 166 kilometres (103 mi)
- Apogee altitude: 232 kilometres (144 mi)
- Inclination: 64.97 degrees
- Period: 88.47 minutes
- Epoch: 1 December 1960, 02:26:00 UTC

Korabl-Sputnik 3 (Russian: Корабль-Спутник 3 meaning Ship-Satellite 3) or Vostok-1K No.3, also known as Sputnik 6 in the West, was a Soviet spacecraft which was launched in 1960. It was a test flight of the Vostok spacecraft, carrying two dogs: Pcholka and Mushka ("little bee" and "little fly"; affectionate diminutives of "pchela" and "mukha", respectively), mice, rats, rabbits, flies, plants, as well as a television camera and scientific instruments.

Soviet space plans for the next several months were ambitious and included Vostok missions, planetary probes, military reconnaissance, and scientific satellites but the first were given priority. However, the Mars shots ended up going first in October and only after those missions flew could the next Vostok test took place. There was still wrangling over the exact design of the Vostok ejection system, and it was eventually decided to eject the cosmonaut using an ejection seat from a relatively low altitude instead of an enclosed capsule as it had been originally envisioned. There was also the possibility that the Vostok's retrorocket could fail and leave the cosmonaut stuck in orbit. It was too late in the spacecraft's design phase to add a backup retrorocket, but the problem could be solved by putting the Vostok into a low enough orbit that it would decay in ten days; the spacecraft had enough consumables onboard to last that long.

Korabl-Sputnik 3 was launched at 07:30:04 UTC on 1 December 1960, atop a Vostok-L carrier rocket flying from Site 1/5 at the Baikonur Cosmodrome. It was successfully placed into low Earth orbit and Western observers quickly noticed that the orbit was lower than the previous Vostok test flights. All spacecraft systems functioned normally right up until reentry. On the 17th orbit, ground controllers issued the commands to perform the deorbit burn. The retrorocket activated but the capsule did not separate from the instrument module. The APO self-destruct system then activated followed by total loss of data. It was obvious that something went very wrong and the spacecraft had been destroyed, but it would take a while to figure out what it was.

Analysis of telemetry data confirmed a malfunction of the infrared orientation sensor. The attitude control jets maneuvered Korabl-Sputnik 3 into the wrong orientation for reentry, resulting in an unpredictable landing point--Boris Chertok calculated that it would land somewhere in China. The flight control system missed the required time marker for the atmospheric entry measured by a G-force sensor, activating the APO and blowing the descent module to pieces. Both Pchyolka and Mushka were killed in the resulting disintegration. They were the last dogs to die in a Soviet space mission, after Laika, who was never intended to survive her Sputnik 2 flight, and Chaika and Lisichka, perishing after the rocket carrying their "Korabl Sputnik" spacecraft disintegrated 20 seconds into the flight. An official TASS announcement confirmed that Korabl-Sputnik 3 had been destroyed upon reentry.

The backup Vostok spacecraft and booster were erected on LC-1 and on 22 December, the dogs Damka and Krasavka lifted off. All went well though the core stage burn. At T+304 seconds, a command was issued to the Blok E stage to begin pressurizing the fuel feed system for engine start. However, telemetry indicated that the command was never received. The Blok E engine activated at T+321 seconds but cut off after 111 seconds of operation instead of the intended 355 seconds and orbital velocity could not be attained. Sensing the loss of acceleration from the Blok E, the spacecraft system issued the normal command to separate from the rocket stage. It began to fall back to Earth and the increasing heat of reentry triggered the separation sequence between the instrument and descent modules.

The descent module was tracked to a reentry point somewhere in north central Siberia some 3,000 kilometers (1,868 miles) downrange from the Baikonur launch complex. Engineer Fedor Vostokov was assigned to lead the recovery team due to his expertise in designing the cabin that housed the dogs. He met with a military explosives expert and they boarded an Il-18 aircraft and picked up a search and rescue team in Krasnoyarsk. The explosives expert was needed to disarm the potentially still live APO system in the capsule. An aerial search near Tura on December 23 failed to find any sign of the capsule but another attempt the next morning found that it had landed in a snow bank on a plateau, 60 kilometers (37 miles) from Tura.

The rescue team waded through deep snow and frigid temperatures, below -30C, to the capsule. The cabin was still inside but the ejector mechanism had launched itself without taking the cabin with it for reasons unknown but possibly due to high G-loads during descent. The explosives expert quickly disconnected the wires for the APO system. Upon opening the GKZh container, Damka and Krasavka were found shivering but alive despite two days of being trapped in there. The other biological specimens had died as they were unable to handle the cold. The landing spot was at a latitude of 64N and there were less than 4 hours of daylight at this time of year so the rescue team had to get the capsule out of there before dark. An Mi-4 helicopter extracted the capsule but could barely handle its two ton bulk. It had to fly the capsule 600 kilometers (372 miles) to Turukhansk to be picked up by an An-12 transport aircraft (the An-12 could not land near Tura due to the lack of a suitable runway there).

Postflight analysis found that the Blok E stage's gas generator had failed at T+425 seconds and resulted in premature engine shutdown. The flight also resulted in a redesign of the ejector seat to ensure it would work properly on crewed missions. As the dogs had otherwise been successfully recovered, Korolev believed the Soviet state media should acknowledge the aborted launch but Soviet premier Nikita Khrushchev refused as he was unwilling to publicly admit to two unsuccessful missions in a row. The flight was not officially admitted to until the glasnost era of the late 1980s.
