= Vostok-K =

1960s Soviet rocket

Vostok-K (8K72K)
- Vostok-K rocket
- Function: Small-lift launch vehicle
- Manufacturer: OKB-1
- Country of origin: Soviet Union

Size
- Height: 30.84 m (101.2 ft)
- Diameter: 2.99 m (9 ft 10 in)
- Mass: 281,375 kg (620,326 lb)
- Stages: 3

Capacity

Payload to LEO
- Mass: 4,730 kg (10,430 lb)

Associated rockets
- Family: R-7
- Derivative work: Vostok-2

Launch history
- Status: Retired
- Launch sites: Baikonur, Site 1/5
- Total launches: 13
- Success(es): 11
- Failure: 2
- First flight: 22 December 1960
- Last flight: 10 July 1964
- Carries passengers or cargo: Vostok

Boosters (First stage) – Block B, V, G & D (Note: This is a transliteration of the second through fifth letters of the Cyrillic alphabet (Б, В, Г, Д). A sense-for-sense translation would correspond to the second through fifth letters of the Latin alphabet, 'Block B, C, D & E'.)
- No. boosters: 4
- Powered by: 1 × RD-107-8D74-1959
- Maximum thrust: 970.86 kN (218,260 lb_{f})
- Total thrust: 3,883.44 kN (873,030 lb_{f})
- Burn time: 118 seconds
- Propellant: LOX / RP-1

Second stage (core) – Block A
- Powered by: 1 × RD-108-8D75-1959
- Maximum thrust: 912 kN (205,000 lb_{f})
- Burn time: 301 seconds
- Propellant: LOX / RP-1

Third stage
- Powered by: 1 × RD-0109
- Maximum thrust: 54.5 kN (12,300 lb_{f})
- Burn time: 365 seconds
- Propellant: LOX / RP-1

The Vostok-K (Russian: Восток meaning "East"), GRAU index 8K72K was an expendable carrier rocket used by the Soviet Union for thirteen launches between 1960 and 1964, six of which were crewed. It incorporated several modifications to the core and strap-ons to man-rate them and the Blok E stage also had the improved RD-0109 engine to correct some deficiences in the RD-0105 used on earlier 8K78s. It was a member of the Vostok family of rockets.

The Vostok-K made its maiden flight on 22 December 1960, three weeks after the retirement of the Vostok-L. The third stage engine failed 425 seconds after launch, and the payload, a Korabl-Sputnik spacecraft, failed to reach orbit. The spacecraft was recovered after landing, and the two dogs aboard the spacecraft survived the flight.

On 12 April 1961, a Vostok-K rocket was used to launch Vostok 1, the first human spaceflight, making Yuri Gagarin the first human to fly in space. All six crewed missions of the Vostok programme were launched using Vostok-K rockets. The first two Zenit reconnaissance satellites were also launched with the Vostok-K, but it was soon replaced in that capacity with the uprated Vostok-2 booster. After the conclusion of the Vostok program, there were two remaining 8K72Ks left; these were used to launch four Elektron scientific satellites on 30 January and 10 July 1964. There had been plans for additional Vostok missions after Vostok 6; had these flown, they would have used a booster based on the newer 8K74 core.

== Launches ==
Vostok-K was used for thirteen launches between 1960 and 1964, from Baikonur LC-1/5.

Vostok-K (8K72K) launches
Date	Serial No.	Payload	Result
22 December 1960	L1-13A	Korabl-Sputnik	Failure
9 March 1961	E103-14	Korabl-Sputnik 4	Success
25 March 1961	E103-15	Korabl-Sputnik 5	Success
12 April 1961	E103-16	Vostok 1	Success
6 August 1961	E103-17	Vostok 2	Success
11 December 1961	E103-21	Kosmos	Failure
26 April 1962	E103-20	Kosmos 4	Success
11 August 1962	E103-23	Vostok 3	Success
12 August 1962	E103-22	Vostok 4	Success
14 June 1963	E103-24	Vostok 5	Success
16 June 1963	E103-25	Vostok 6	Success
30 January 1964	G103-18	Elektron 1 / Elektron 2	Success
10 July 1964	G103-19	Elektron 3 / Elektron 4	Success
