= Vostok 2 =

Space mission of USSR

- The first photograph of Earth taken by a person in space, photographed by Gherman Titov.
- Operator: Soviet space program
- Harvard designation: 1961 Tau 1
- COSPAR ID: 1961-019A
- SATCAT no.: 168
- Mission duration: 1 day, 1 hour, 18 minutes
- Orbits completed: 17.5

Spacecraft properties
- Spacecraft: Vostok-3KA No.4
- Manufacturer: Experimental Design OKB-1
- Launch mass: 4,731 kilograms (10,430 lb)

Crew
- Crew size: 1
- Members: Gherman Titov
- Callsign: Орёл (Oryol - "Eagle")

Start of mission
- Launch date: August 6, 1961, 06:00 UTC
- Rocket: Vostok-K 8K72K
- Launch site: Baikonur 1/5

End of mission
- Landing date: August 7, 1961, 07:18 UTC
- Landing site: Krasny Kut; 50.85276°N 47.02048°E

Orbital parameters
- Reference system: Geocentric
- Regime: Low Earth
- Eccentricity: 0.00501
- Perigee altitude: 166 kilometres (103 mi)
- Apogee altitude: 232 kilometres (144 mi)
- Inclination: 64.93 degrees
- Period: 88.46 minutes
- Epoch: 6 August 1961, 02:00:00 UTC
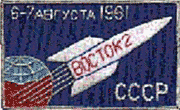
- Vostok program

Vostok 2 (Russian: Восток-2, lit. 'Orient 2' or 'East 2') was a Soviet space mission which carried cosmonaut Gherman Titov into orbit for a full day on August 6, 1961, to study the effects of a more prolonged period of weightlessness on the human body. Titov orbited the Earth over 17 times, exceeding the single orbit of Yuri Gagarin on Vostok 1 – as well as the suborbital spaceflights of American astronauts Alan Shepard and Gus Grissom aboard their respective Mercury-Redstone 3 and 4 missions. Titov's number of orbits and flight time would not be surpassed by an American astronaut until Gordon Cooper's Mercury-Atlas 9 spaceflight in May 1963.

== History ==
After the flight of Vostok 1, Sergei Korolev took a short vacation in Crimea where he began working out the flight plan for the next mission. There were considerable arguments over the duration of the mission as flight doctors argued for no more than three orbits. The flight of Korabl-Sputnik 2 nine months earlier had carried two dogs on a six orbit mission, during which the animals had experienced convulsions and thus all subsequent Vostok missions were limited to three orbits maximum. Although dogs and humans were very different physiologically, the doctors were worried about the risks posed on a longer flight. There was also the purely practical aspect of spacecraft recovery. If Vostok 2 flew three orbits, reentry and landing would take place in the wide open steppes of southern Russia, the landing site moving steadily further west with each orbit. Orbits 8–13 would drop the capsule into the Pacific Ocean, after which landing would again occur in Soviet territory, but in the remote, frozen wastes of Siberia. Thus, it was necessary to spend a full 24 hours in space before it would be once again possible to land in the prime recovery area in southern Russia. The three orbit limit thus would not only make landing easy, but minimize risks to the cosmonaut posed by prolonged weightlessness.

Korolev argued that since it would still take an entire day for landing in southern Russia to be possible again, there was no reason not to go for it. Besides, he argued, missions of the future would inevitably require lengthy stays in space. The flight was targeted for somewhere between July 25 and August 5. To ensure safe radiation levels, balloons equipped with Geiger counters were flown aloft; in addition, similar equipment would be carried on Vostok 2. Several enhancements were made to Vostok 2, including an improved TV transmission system and better climate control systems.

Liftoff took place August 6 at 8:57 AM Moscow time and booster performance was almost flawless, placing the spacecraft into a 184x244 km orbit.

The flight was an almost complete success, marred only by a heater that had inadvertently been turned off prior to liftoff and that allowed the inside temperature to drop to 50 °F (10 °C), a bout of space sickness, and a troublesome re-entry when the reentry module failed to separate cleanly from its service module.

Unlike Yuri Gagarin on Vostok 1, Titov took manual control of the spacecraft for a short while. Another change came when the Soviets admitted that Titov did not land with his spacecraft. Titov would claim in an interview that he ejected from his capsule as a test of an alternative landing system; it is now known that all Vostok program landings were performed this way.

The re-entry capsule was destroyed during development of the Voskhod spacecraft.

Titov was a month short of 26 years old at launch. He was the youngest person to reach space until the launch of Blue Origin NS-16 in 2021. He remains the youngest person to orbit the Earth.

== Pilot ==
Position	Crew
Pilot	Gherman Titov; Only spaceflight

=== Backup ===
Position	Crew
Pilot	Andrian G. Nikolayev

=== Reserve ===
Position	Crew
Pilot	Grigori Nelyubov

== Mission parameters ==
- Mass: 4,731 kg (10,430 lb)
- Perigee: 183 km (114 mi)
- Apogee: 244 km (152 mi)
- Inclination: 64.93°
- Period: 88.46 minutes

== Mission highlights ==
Gherman Titov launched from Gagarin's Start at Baikonur Cosmodrome on 6 August 1961 at 06:00 UTC aboard the Vostok 2 space capsule. Radio personality Yuri Levitan interrupted Radio Moscow programming with an announcement of the flight at 07:45 UTC.

Nausea set in after Titov achieved free fall in orbit, causing him to vomit when he tried to eat one of his planned meals. Soviet space program officials suspected disturbance of Titov's vestibular system was to blame, leading them to begin early investigations into what is now known as space adaptation syndrome, or space sickness. Titov is believed to be the first spacefarer to experience the condition.

Commemorative pin from Vostok 2 Mission

Titov took manual control of the capsule's attitude for a time as he passed over Africa on his first orbit and would again at the end of the seventh orbit; the controls were reported to function well. Titov exchanged greetings with Soviet Premier Nikita Khrushchev as he passed over the Soviet Union at the end of his first orbit, replicating Gagarin's feat. During his flight the first manual photographs were taken from orbit, thus setting a record for first photos of Earth from space. He also was the first person to film the Earth using, for ten minutes, a professional quality Konvas-Avtomat movie camera.

A camera aboard the capsule transmitted smiling pictures of Titov to the ground as he passed over Soviet territory on the fifth orbit. Titov settled down to sleep during the seventh orbit; he awoke over eight hours later, 37 minutes after the scheduled end of his sleep period. Sleep did not relieve Titov's serious discomfort; he still felt very ill after awaking. After 12 orbits Titov suddenly began to recover, and became "completely functional and fully fit".

Detailed information about the radio frequencies used by the spacecraft were made public before Titov's flight; listening posts around the world picked up voice and telemetry signals from Vostok 2, allaying suspicions that the spaceflight might have been faked.

As on Vostok 1, the Vostok 2 service module failed to detach from the reentry module when commanded and reentry began with the former still attached; the conjoined modules gyrated violently until aerodynamic heating burned through the straps still holding them together. Titov ejected from the capsule as planned and parachuted separately to land at 0718 UTC on 7 August 1961, near Krasny Kut, Saratov Oblast. Just prior to ejecting, Titov turned his head to look at something and so got his face rammed into his helmet at ejection, giving himself a bloody nose.

The Vostok 2 landing site coordinates are 50.85276°N 47.02048°E, which is 11.5 km South of Krasny Kut, Saratovskaya oblast in the Russian Federation. At the roadside site are two monuments dedicated to the Vostok 2 mission. The larger one is a 9 meter tall, silver painted stone sculpture, that resembles a single bird's wing pointed skyward. The center of the wing has a series of looping openings, one atop the next, that resemble a row of feathers. To the right of the wing sculpture is a 2 meter high, silver painted square stone block, with a rounded corner on the front side. A portrait of Titov, wearing a space helmet, is on one side of the stone block, the other side contains red painted text commemorating the mission.

In 1964, the Vostok 2 capsule was reused as a ballast weight in a test of an experimental parachute system planned for the Voskhod capsule. The prototype malfunctioned, shattering Vostok 2 into tiny pieces.
