= Korabl-Sputnik 4 =

1961 USSR unmanned test launch of the Vostok spacecraft

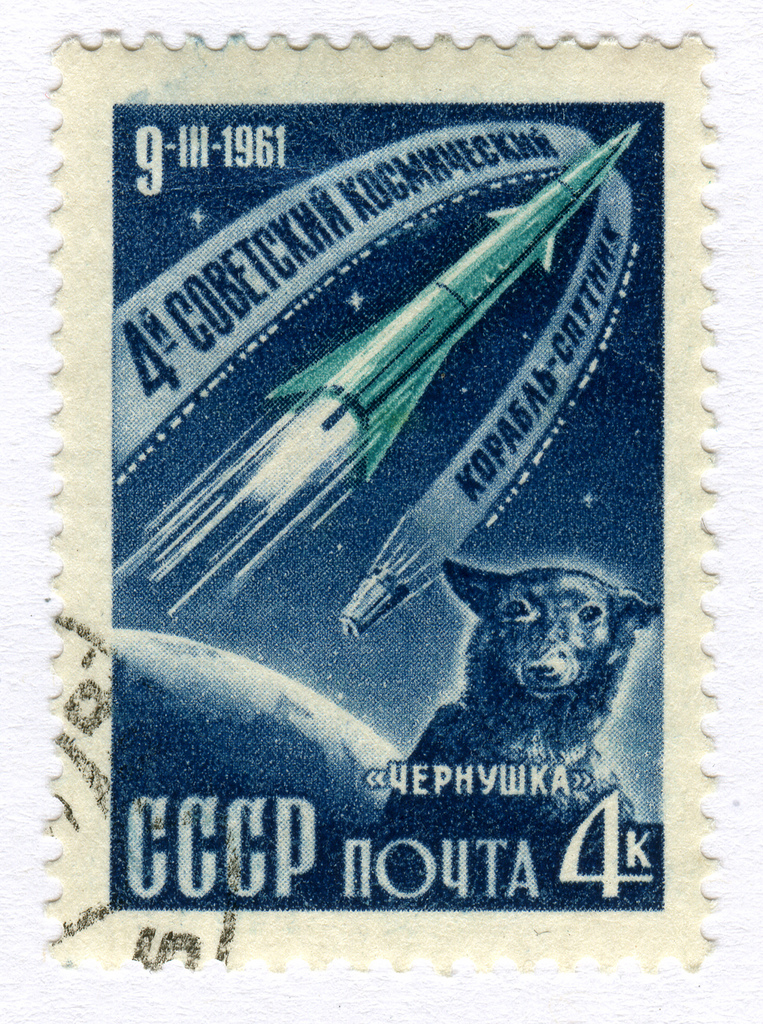
- 1961 postage stamp
- Names: Sputnik 9
- Mission type: Biological; Technology
- Operator: Soviet space program
- Harvard designation: 1960 Theta 1
- COSPAR ID: 1961-008A
- SATCAT no.: 91
- Mission duration: 1 hour, 41 minutes

Spacecraft properties
- Spacecraft type: Vostok-3KA
- Manufacturer: OKB-1
- Launch mass: 4,700 kilograms (10,400 lb)

Start of mission
- Launch date: 9 March 1961, 06:29:00 UTC
- Rocket: Vostok-K 8K72K
- Launch site: Baikonur 1/5

End of mission
- Landing date: 9 March 1961, 08:09:54 UTC

Orbital parameters
- Reference system: Geocentric
- Regime: Low Earth
- Perigee altitude: 173 kilometres (107 mi)
- Apogee altitude: 239 kilometres (149 mi)
- Inclination: 64.93 degrees
- Period: 88.6 minutes

Korabl-Sputnik 4 (Russian: Корабль-Спутник 4 meaning Ship-Satellite 4) or Vostok-3KA No.1, also known as Sputnik 9 in the West, was a Soviet spacecraft which was launched on 9 March 1961. Carrying the mannequin Ivan Ivanovich, a dog named Chernushka, some mice and the first guinea pig in space, it was a test flight of the Vostok spacecraft.

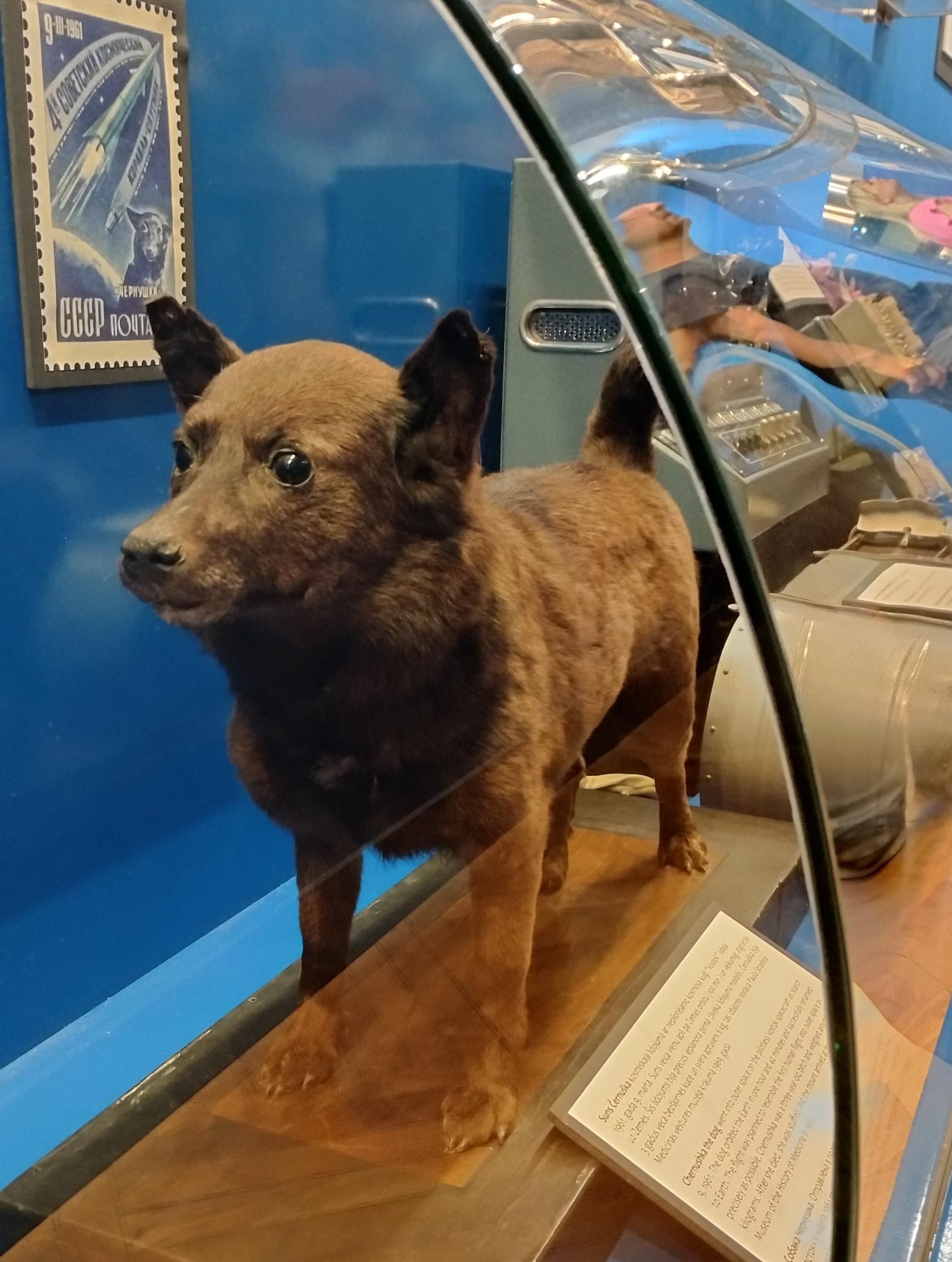
Chernushka the dog at Pauls Stradins Museum of the History of Medicine in Riga

Korabl-Sputnik 4 was launched at 06:29:00 UTC on 9 March 1961, atop a Vostok-K carrier rocket flying from Site 1/5 at the Baikonur Cosmodrome. It was successfully placed into low Earth orbit. The spacecraft was only intended to complete a single orbit, so it was deorbited shortly after launch, and reentered on its first pass over the Soviet Union. It landed at 08:09:54 UTC, and was successfully recovered. During the descent, the mannequin was ejected from the spacecraft in a test of its ejection seat, and descended separately under its own parachute.
