= Space adaptation syndrome =

Condition caused by weightlessness

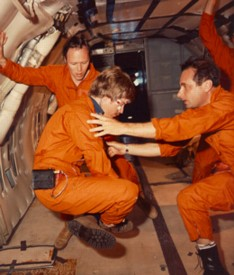
- NASA astronauts acclimating themselves to space adaptation syndrome in a KC-135 airplane that flies parabolic arcs to create short periods of weightlessness. In about two thirds of the passengers, these flights produce nausea, giving the plane its nickname "vomit comet".
- Specialty: Space medicine
- Prevalence: 50% of individuals

Space adaptation syndrome (SAS) or space sickness is a condition experienced by as many as half of all space travelers during their adaptation to weightlessness once in orbit. It is the opposite of terrestrial motion sickness since it occurs when the environment and the person appear visually to be in motion relative to one another even though there is no corresponding sensation of bodily movement originating from the vestibular system.

== Presentation ==
Space motion sickness can lead to degraded astronaut performance. SMS threatens operational requirements, reduces situational awareness, and threatens the safety of those exposed to micro-g environments. Lost muscle mass leads to difficulty with movement, especially when astronauts return to Earth. This can pose a safety issue if the need for emergency egress were to arise. Loss of muscle power makes it extremely difficult, if not impossible, for astronauts to climb through emergency egress hatches or create unconventional exit spaces in the case of a crash upon landing. Additionally, bone resorption and inadequate hydration in space can lead to the formation of kidney stones, and subsequent sudden incapacitation due to pain. If this were to occur during critical phases of flight, a capsule crash leading to worker injury and/or death could result. Short-term and long-term health effects have been seen in the cardiovascular system from exposure to the micro-g environment that would limit those exposed after they return to Earth or a regular gravity environment. Steps need to be taken to ensure proper precautions are taken into consideration when dealing with a micro-g environment for worker safety. Orthostatic intolerance can lead to temporary loss of consciousness due to the lack of pressure and stroke volume. This loss of consciousness inhibits and endangers those affected and can lead to deadly consequences.

== Cause ==
Your body just isn't built to deal with zero-gravity. But there's no way of predicting how someone will handle it. Someone who gets car-sick all the time can be fine in space—or the opposite. I'm fine in cars and on rollercoasters, but space is a different matter.

— Steven Smith

When the vestibular system and the visual system report incongruous states of motion, the result is often nausea and other symptoms of disorientation known as motion sickness. According to contemporary sensory conflict theory, such conditions happen when the vestibular system and the visual system do not present a synchronized and unified representation of one's body and surroundings. This theory is also known as neural mismatch, implying a mismatch occurring between ongoing sensory experience and long-term memory rather than between components of the vestibular and visual systems, emphasizing "the limbic system in integration of sensory information and long-term memory, in the expression of the symptoms of motion sickness, and the impact of anti-motion-sickness drugs and stress hormones on limbic system function. The limbic system may be the neural mismatch center of the brain." A "fully adequate theory of motion sickness is not presently available" but at present the sensory conflict theory, referring to "a discontinuity between either visual, proprioceptive, and somatosensory input, or semicircular canal and otolith input", may be the best available. Space adaptation syndrome or space sickness is a kind of motion sickness that can occur when one's surroundings visually appear to be in motion, but without a corresponding sense of bodily motion. This incongruous condition can occur during space travel when changes in g-forces compromise one's spatial orientation. According to Science Daily, "Gravity plays a major role in our spatial orientation. Changes in gravitational forces, such as the transition to weightlessness during a space voyage, influence our spatial orientation and require adaptation by many of the physiological processes in which our balance system plays a part. As long as this adaptation is incomplete, this can be coupled to nausea, visual illusions, and disorientation." Sleep deprivation can also increase susceptibility to space sickness, making symptoms worse and longer-lasting.

According to the sensory conflict hypothesis, space sickness is the opposite of the kinds of motion-related disorientation that occur in the presence of gravity, known as terrestrial motion sickness, such as becoming carsick, seasick, or airsick. In such cases, and in contrast to space sickness, one's surroundings seem visually immobile (such as inside a car or airplane or a cabin below decks) while one's body feels itself to be in motion. Contemporary motion sickness medications can counter various forms of motion disorientation including space sickness by temporarily suppressing the vestibular system, but are rarely used for space travel because it is considered better to allow space travelers to adapt naturally over the first one to seven days rather than to suffer the drowsiness and other side effects of medication taken over a longer period. However, transdermal dimenhydrinate anti-nausea patches are typically used whenever space suits are worn because vomiting into a space suit could be fatal by obscuring vision or blocking airflow. Space suits are generally worn during launch and landing by NASA crew members and always for extra-vehicular activities (EVAs). EVAs are consequently not usually scheduled for the first days of a mission to allow the crew to adapt, and transdermal dimenhydrinate patches are typically used as an additional backup measure.

== Management ==
Just as space sickness has the opposite cause compared to terrestrial motion sickness, the two conditions have opposite non-medicinal remedies. The idea of sensory conflict implies that the most direct remedy for motion sickness in general is to resolve the conflict by re-synchronizing what one sees and what one feels. For most (but not all) kinds of terrestrial motion sickness, that can be achieved by viewing one's surroundings from a window or (in the case of seasickness) going up on deck to observe the seas. For space sickness, relief is available via the opposite move of restricting one's vision to a small area such as a book or a small screen, disregarding the overall surroundings until the adaptation process is complete, or simply to close one's eyes until the nauseated feeling is reduced in intensity during the adjustment period. Some research indicates that blindness itself does not provide relief; "Motion sickness can occur during exposure to physical motion, visual motion, and virtual motion, and only those without a functioning vestibular system are fully immune.

As with sea sickness and car sickness, space motion sickness symptoms can vary from mild nausea and disorientation to vomiting and intense discomfort; headaches and nausea are often reported in varying degrees. The most extreme reaction yet recorded was that felt by Senator Jake Garn in 1985 on Space Shuttle flight STS-51-D. NASA later jokingly began using the informal "Garn scale" to measure reactions to space sickness. In most cases, symptoms last from 2–4 days. When asked about the origins of "Garn", Robert E. Stevenson said:

Jake Garn was sick, was pretty sick. I don't know whether we should tell stories like that. But anyway, Jake Garn, he has made a mark in the Astronaut Corps because he represents the maximum level of space sickness that anyone can ever attain, and so the mark of being totally sick and totally incompetent is one Garn. Most guys will get maybe to a tenth Garn if that high. And within the Astronaut Corps, he forever will be remembered by that.

Garn's purpose on the mission was in part to subject him to experiments on space motion sickness. Predicting whether someone will experience space sickness is not possible. Someone who suffers from car sickness may not suffer from space sickness, and vice versa. In excellent physical condition, Garn did not become sick on the vomit comet before STS-51-D. All three astronauts on Skylab 3 suffered from nausea, although the three on Skylab 2 had not; the illness affected their work during the first few days, worrying NASA doctors.

Experienced aviators and space travelers can suffer from space sickness. Garn began piloting at the age of 16 and piloted a variety of military aircraft for 17,000 hours—more than any NASA astronaut—before STS-51-D. Charles D. Walker became ill on the same flight despite having flown on the shuttle before. While the Skylab 3 crew quickly recovered—whether by eating six smaller meals instead of three larger ones, or just by becoming used to space—one of the Skylab 4 crew became sick despite anti-nausea medication. Steven Smith estimated that on four shuttle flights he threw up 100 times.

Space sickness that occurs during space flight can also continue for days after landing, until the vestibular system has again adapted to gravity.

== History ==
In August 1961, Soviet cosmonaut Gherman Titov became the first human to experience space sickness on Vostok 2; he was the first person to vomit in space.

Apart from that record, space motion sickness was effectively unknown during the earliest spaceflights (Mercury, Gemini series) probably because these missions were undertaken in spacecraft providing very cramped conditions and permitting very little room for head movements; space sickness seems to be aggravated by being able to freely move around, especially in regard to head movement, and so is more common in larger spacecraft.

== See also ==
- Airsickness – Motion sickness induced by air travel
- Effect of spaceflight on the human body – Medical issues associated with spaceflight
- Human spaceflight – Spaceflight with a crew or passengers
- Micro-g environment – Absence of the sensation of weight
- Space medicine – Application of medicine during spaceflight
