= Vostok (spacecraft) =

First crewed spacecraft built by the Soviet Union

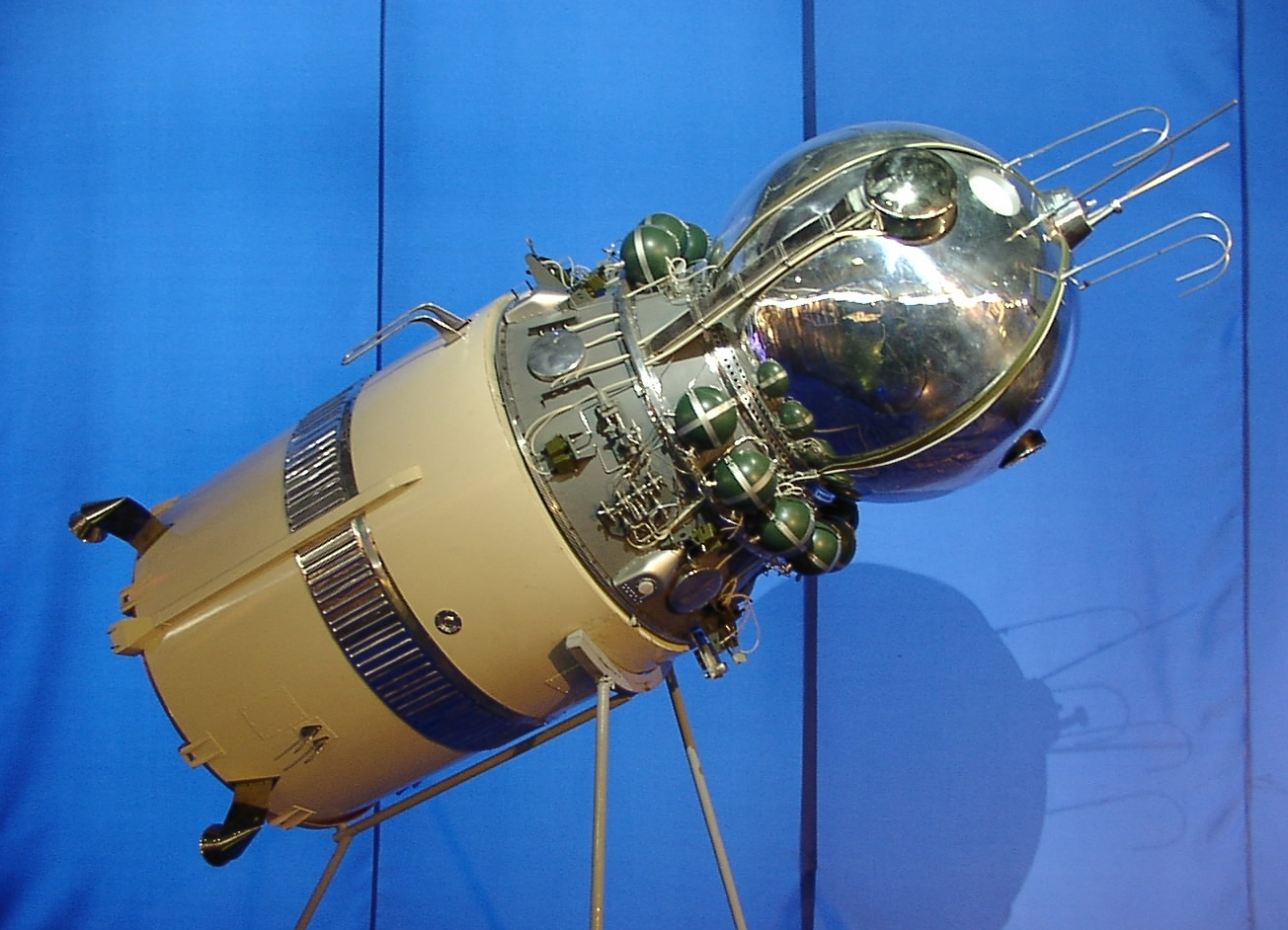
- Model of Vostok 3KA spacecraft with third stage of launcher.
- Manufacturer: OKB-1
- Designer: Sergei Korolev
- Country of origin: Soviet Union
- Operator: OKB-1
- Applications: Single-pilot Earth orbit

Specifications
- Crew capacity: 1
- Dimensions: 2.43 meters (8.0 ft) diameter x 4.55 meters (14.9 ft) long
- Regime: Low Earth orbit

Production
- Status: Retired
- Launched: 13
- Retired: 9
- Failed: 2
- Lost: 2
- Maiden launch: 15 May 1960; Korabl-Sputnik 1
- Last launch: 16 June 1963; Vostok 6

Related spacecraft
- Derivatives: Foton; Voskhod; Zenit; Bion

Configuration
Voskhod →

Vostok (Russian: Восток, lit. 'East') was a class of single-pilot crewed spacecraft built by the Soviet Union. The first human spaceflight was accomplished with Vostok 1 on April 12, 1961, by Soviet cosmonaut Yuri Gagarin.

The Vostok programme made six crewed spaceflights from 1961 through 1963. This was followed in 1964 and 1965 by two flights of Vostok spacecraft modified for up to three pilots, identified as Voskhod. By the late 1960s, these were replaced with Soyuz spacecraft, which are still used as of 2025.

== Development ==
The Vostok spacecraft was originally designed for use both as a camera platform (for the Soviet Union's first spy satellite program, Zenit) and as a crewed spacecraft. This dual-use design was crucial in gaining Communist Party support for the program. The basic Vostok design has remained in use for some 40 years, gradually adapted for a range of other uncrewed satellites. The descent module design was reused, in heavily modified form, by the Voskhod program for their Voskhod capsule.

== Design ==
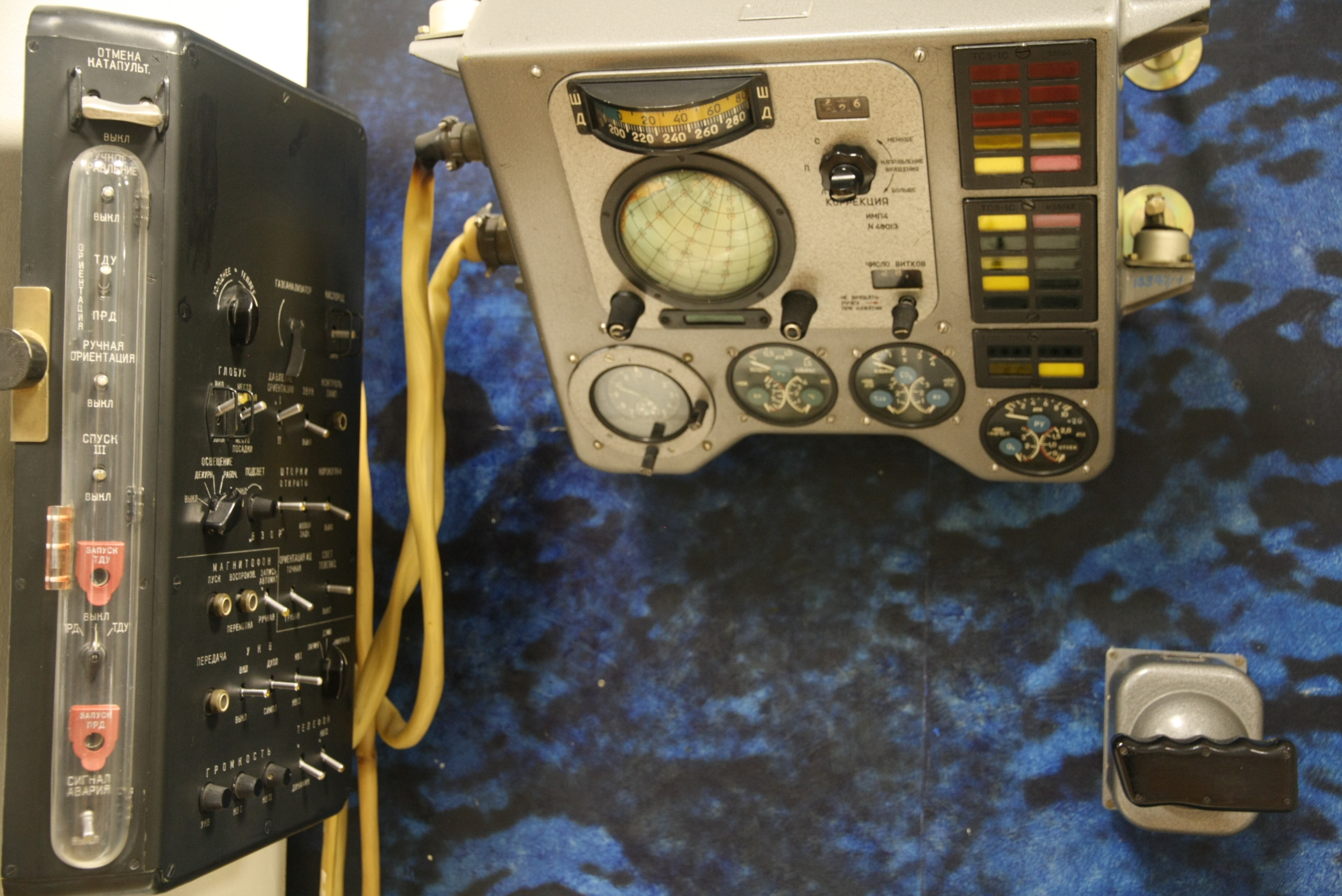
Arrangement of instruments and controls in the cockpit of Vostok ships

The craft consisted of a spherical descent module (mass 2.46 tonnes, diameter 2.3 metres), which housed the cosmonaut, instruments and escape system, and a biconical instrument module (mass 2.27 tonnes, 2.25 m long, 2.43 m wide), which contained propellant and the engine system. On reentry, the cosmonaut would eject from the craft at about 7,000 m (23,000 ft) and descend via parachute, while the capsule would land separately. The reason for this was that the Vostok descent module made an extremely rough landing that could have left a cosmonaut seriously injured.

The ejector seat also served as an escape mechanism in the event of a launch vehicle failure, which at this early phase of the space program was a common occurrence. If an accident occurred in the first 40 seconds after liftoff, the cosmonaut would eject from the spacecraft and parachute to Earth. From 40 to 150 seconds into launch, ground controllers could issue a manual shutdown command to the booster. When the launch vehicle fell to a low enough altitude, the cosmonaut would eject. Higher altitude failures after shroud jettison would involve detaching the entire spacecraft from the booster.

One problem that was never adequately resolved was the event of a launch vehicle malfunction in the first 20 seconds, when the ejector seat would not have enough time to deploy its parachute. LC-1 at the Baikonour Cosmodrome had netting placed around it to catch the descent module should the cosmonaut eject while still on the pad, but it was of doubtful value since they would likely end up landing too close to the exploding booster. An accident in the initial seconds of launch also likely would have not put the cosmonaut in a position where they could make a survivable ejection and in all probability, this situation would have resulted in their death. A 2001 recollection by V.V. Molodsov stated that Chief Designer Sergei Korolev felt "absolutely terrible" about the inadequate provisions for crew escape on the Vostok during the opening seconds of launch.

There were several models of the Vostok leading up to the crewed version:

=== Vostok 1K ===
Prototype spacecraft. This was used in the Korabl-Sputnik 2 mission, in which the first animals were recovered from orbit.

=== Vostok 2K ===
Photo-reconnaissance and signals intelligence spacecraft. Later named Zenit spy satellite.

=== Vostok 3KA ===
The Vostok 3KA was the spacecraft used for the first human spaceflights. They were launched from Baikonur Cosmodrome using Vostok 8K72K launch vehicles. The first flight of a Vostok 3KA occurred on March 9, 1961. The first flight with a crew—Vostok 1 carrying Yuri Gagarin—took place on April 12, 1961. The last flight—Vostok 6 carrying the first woman in space, Valentina Tereshkova—took place on June 16, 1963.

A total of 8 Vostok 3KA spacecraft were flown, 6 of them with a human crew.

Specifications for this version are:

Reentry Module: Vostok SA. SA stands for Spuskaemiy apparat - descent system. It was nicknamed "Sharik" (Russian: шарик, lit. 'little sphere').

- Crew Size: 1
- Diameter: 2.3 m sphere
- Mass: 2,460 kg
- Heat Shield Mass: 837 kg
- Recovery equipment: 151 kg
- Parachute deploys at 2.5 km altitude
- Crew seat and provisions: 336 kg
- Crew ejects at 7 km altitude
- Ballistic reentry acceleration: 8 g (78 m/s²)

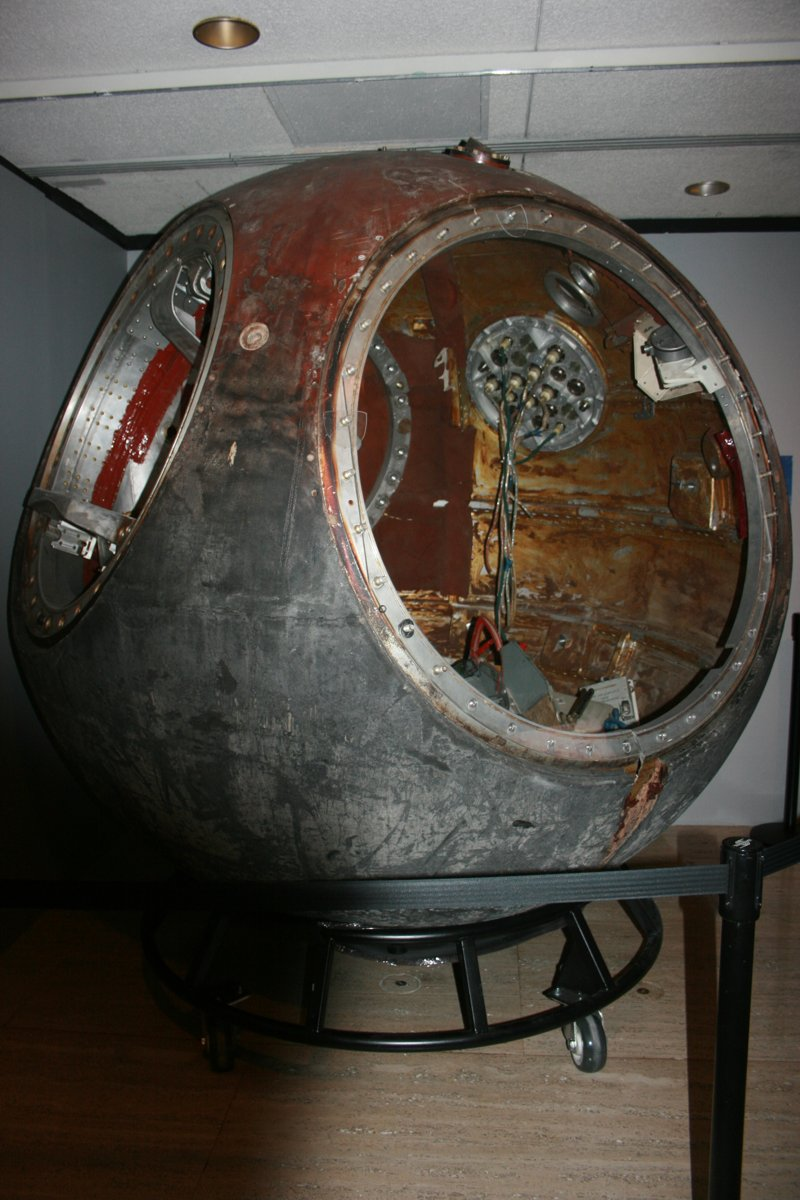
Vostok "Sharik"

Equipment Module: Vostok PA. PA stands for Priborniy otsek - instrument section.

- Length: 2.25 m
- Diameter: 2.43 m
- Mass: 2,270 kg
- Equipment in pressurized compartment
- RCS Thrusters: 16 x 5 N (8 + 8 for automatic + manual)
- RCS Thrusters pressure: 59 PSI (4 bars)
- RCS Propellants: Cold gas (nitrogen) at 2200 PSI (150 bar)
- RCS Propellants: 20 kg stored in 12 pressure bottles (5 + 5 + 2 for first, second and reserve)
- Main Engine(the S5.4) (TDU): 397 kg
- Main Engine Thrust: 15.83 kN
- Main Engine Propellants: RFNA/amine
- Main Engine Propellants: 275 kg
- Main Engine Isp: 266 s (2.61 kN·s/kg)
- Main Engine Burn Time: 1 minute (typical retro burn = 42 seconds)
- Spacecraft delta v: 155 m/s
- Electrical System: Batteries
- Electric System: 0.20 average kW
- Electric System: 24.0 kW·h
- Total Mass:4,730 kg
- Endurance: Supplies for 10 days in orbit
- Launch Vehicle: Vostok 8K72K
- Typical orbit: 177 km x 471 km, 64.9 inclination

== Reentry ==
The Vostok capsule had limited thruster capability. As a result, the reentry path and orientation could not be controlled after the capsule had separated from the engine system. This meant that the capsule had to be protected from reentry heat on all sides, thus explaining the spherical design (as opposed to Project Mercury's conical design, which allowed for maximum volume while minimizing the heat shield diameter). Some control of the capsule reentry orientation was possible by way of positioning of the heavy equipment to offset the vehicle center of gravity, which also maximized the chance of the cosmonaut surviving g-forces while in a horizontal position. Even then, the cosmonaut experienced 8 to 9g.

If the retrorocket failed, the spacecraft would naturally decay from orbit within ten days, and the cosmonaut was provided with enough food and oxygen to survive until that time.

== See also ==
- Voskhod (spacecraft)
- Zenit (satellite)
- Foton (space programs)
- Vostok 1
- Vostok rocket
- Spacecraft
- Single-person spacecraft
