= List of Vostok and Voskhod missions =

Vostok and Voskhod were two spacecraft flown by the Soviet Union. Between 1960 and 1966, Vostok and Voskhod performed 11 successful, 2 partially successful and 3 unsuccessful missions. There are allegations that the Soviets had sent more Vostok missions than what Russian officials said, which are excluded from this list.

== Vostok missions ==
Mission	Spacecraft	Launch	Landing	Crew	Outcome	Notes
Korabl-Sputnik 1	1P	15 May 1960	5 September 1962	—N/a	Partial failure	Uncontrolled reentry with debris landing in Manitowoc, Wisconsin
Unnamed	1K-1	28 July 1960	—N/a	—N/a	Failure	Booster exploded on launch killing two dogs flying on the mission - Bars (“Panther” or “Lynx”) and Lisichka (“Little Fox”).
Korabl-Sputnik 2	1K-2	19 August 1960	20 August 1960	—N/a	Success	First spaceflight to send animals into orbit and return them safely back to Earth, including two Soviet space dogs, Belka and Strelka
Korabl-Sputnik 3	1K-3	1 December 1960	2 December 1960	—N/a	Partial failure	capsule burned up on re-entry killing dogs Pchelka and Muska.
Unnamed	1K-4	22 December 1960	—N/a	—N/a	Failure	Launch aborted when upper stage failed preventing injection into orbit. Dogs Damka (“Little Lady”) and Krasavka (“Beauty”) were safely recovered downrange after their suborbital flight.
Korabl-Sputnik 4	3KA-1	9 March 1961	9 March 1961	—N/a	Success	successful flight, included dog Chernushka, some mice, and a guinea pig
Korabl-Sputnik 5	3KA-2	25 March 1961	25 March 1961	—N/a	Success	final test flight prior to Vostok 1, included the dog Zvezdochka ("Starlet") on a single-orbit mission
Vostok 1	3KA-3	12 April 1961	12 April 1961	Yuri Gagarin	Success	First man in space.
Vostok 2	3KA-4	6 August 1961	7 August 1961	Gherman Titov	Success	First crewed mission lasting a full day.
Vostok 3	3KA-5	11 August 1962	15 August 1962	Andriyan Nikolayev	Success	First simultaneous flight of two crewed spacecraft.
Vostok 4	3KA-6	12 August 1962	15 August 1962	Pavel Popovich	Success	First simultaneous flight of two crewed spacecraft.
Vostok 5	3KA-7	14 June 1963	19 June 1963	Valery Bykovsky	Success	Longest solo orbital flight.
Vostok 6	3KA-8	16 June 1963	19 June 1963	Valentina Tereshkova	Success	First woman in space.

== Voskhod missions ==
Mission	Spacecraft	Launch	Landing	Crew	Outcome	Notes
Kosmos 47	3KV-2	6 October 1964	7 October 1964	—N/a	Success	Uncrewed test flight of prototype Soviet Voskhod spacecraft
Voskhod 1	3KV-3	12 October 1964	13 October 1964	Vladimir Komarov; Konstantin Feoktistov; Boris Yegorov	Success	First multi-crewed spacecraft.
Kosmos 57	3KD-1	22 February 1965	6 April 1965	—N/a	Failure	Spacecraft destroyed during third orbit; over 100 pieces of spacecraft debris were tracked, falling into the ocean between 31 March and 6 April 1965.
Voskhod 2	3KD-4	18 March 1965	19 March 1965	Pavel Belyayev; Alexey Leonov	Success	First spacewalk.
Kosmos 110	3KV-5	22 February 1966	16 March 1966	—N/a	Success	Carried two dogs, Veterok ("Breeze") and Ugolyok ("Little piece of coal") to study prolonged effects of space travel.

== See also ==
- Soviet space program
- Voskhod programme
- Vostok programme
