= Information display systems =

Soviet spacecraft control panels

"Information display systems" (IDS) is the general designation for the control panels and displays of Russian (and previous Soviet) spacecraft. For example, the original Soyuz 7K-OK spacecraft used the "Sirius-7k" IDS.

IDS	Components or features	Spacecraft
SIS-1-3KA (Globus IMP)		Vostok 1 (3KA)
SIS-2-3KA		Vostok 2 (3KA)
SIS-3-3KV		Voskhod 1 (3KV)
SIS-4-3KD		Voskhod 2 (3KD)
STVOR	EVA controls	Voskhod 2 (3KD)
Sirius-7K		Soyuz 7K-OK, Soyuz 7K-OKS, Soyuz 7K-T
Saturn		Soyuz 7K-L1
Uran and Orion		Soyuz 7K-LOK
Luch		LK (spacecraft)
Sirius-A8		Soyuz 7K-TM
Sirius-M		Soyuz 7K-TM
Sirius-17K and POV		Salyut 1
Mirzam-17K	PODU-1 and 2 panels for the unified propulsion system (ODU)	Salyut 7
Mars		Almaz
BIPS		Almaz
DISK-1A		Almaz
Iupiter	used in the cargo compartment; PGO-1 and 2 panels	TKS (spacecraft)
Ikar	used in the return module; PVA-1 and 2 panels	TKS (spacecraft)
Pluton	equipment and emergency warning signal	Mir
Mirzam-1A	unified propulsion system	Mir
POV	EVA control panel	Mir
Simvol	guidance and navigation control system	Mir
Stek		Mir
Strela		Mir
Vega-1-GLI	IDS for the commander and the pilot (workstations 1 and 2)	Buran OK-GLI
Vega-2-GLI	IDS for the onboard engineer (workstation 3)	Buran OK-GLI
Vega (1 to 5)	IDSs for the commander and the pilot (workstations 1 and 2), onboard engineer (workstation 3), rendezvous operator (workstation 3), manipulator operator (workstation 4) and payload operator (workstation 5)	Buran (spacecraft)
Neptun		Soyuz T
Simvol	guidance and navigation control system	Soyuz T
Neptun-M		Soyuz TM
Simvol	guidance and navigation control system	Soyuz TM
Neptun-ME		Soyuz TMA
Simvol	guidance and navigation control system	Soyuz TMA
InPU	based on a VGA monitor	ISS
PSS	emergency warning signal system in the Zvezda and Zarya modules	ISS
POV	for the docking module	ISS

== See also ==
Voskhod Spacecraft Globus IMP navigation instrument
