= 1836 Komarov =

Carbonaceous main-belt asteroid

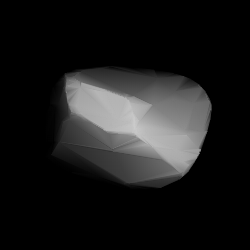
- Shape model of Komarov from its lightcurve

Discovery
- Discovered by: N. Chernykh
- Discovery site: Crimean Astrophysical Obs.
- Discovery date: 26 July 1971

Designations
- Named after: Vladimir Komarov (Soviet cosmonaut)
- Alternative designations: 1971 OT · 1952 KA_{1} 1952 MT · 1961 JG; 1962 SG
- Minor planet category: main-belt · (middle); Dora

Orbital characteristics
- Epoch 16 February 2017 (JD 2457800.5)
- Uncertainty parameter 0
- Observation arc: 63.89 yr (23,334 days)
- Aphelion: 3.3187 AU
- Perihelion: 2.2523 AU
- Semi-major axis: 2.7855 AU
- Eccentricity: 0.1914
- Orbital period (sidereal): 4.65 yr (1,698 days)
- Mean anomaly: 308.73°
- Mean motion: 0° 12^{m} 43.2^{s} / day
- Inclination: 7.0195°
- Longitude of ascending node: 272.76°
- Argument of perihelion: 12.344°

Physical characteristics
- Dimensions: 21.16 km (calculated); 21.55±6.10 km 21.84±6.55 km 22.240±0.304 km 22.86±0.73 km 25.40±9.32 km
- Synodic rotation period: 8.8015±0.0004 h 9.695±0.005 h (Note: Caspari (2008): rotation period 9.695±0.005 hours with a brightness amplitude of 0.56 mag. and a quality code of 2+. Observation date:2008-07-05. Summary figures for (1836) Komarov at Collaborative Asteroid Lightcurve Link (CALL))
- Geometric albedo: 0.042±0.005; 0.043±0.019; 0.05±0.05; 0.057 (assumed); 0.06±0.06; 0.103±0.007
- Spectral type: SMASS = Ch · C
- Absolute magnitude (H): 11.30 · 11.9 · 11.98±0.37 · 12.00 · 12.1 · 12.15

1836 Komarov (prov. designation: 1971 OT) is a carbonaceous Dorian asteroid from the central region of the asteroid belt, approximately 22 kilometers in diameter. It was discovered on 26 July 1971 by Russian astronomer Nikolai Chernykh at Crimean Astrophysical Observatory in Nauchnij on the Crimean peninsula. It was named after Soviet cosmonaut Vladimir Komarov.

== Classification and orbit ==
Komarov is a member of the Dora family (FIN: 512), a well-established central asteroid family of more than 1,200 carbonaceous asteroids. The family's namesake is 668 Dora. It is alternatively known as the "Zhongolovich family", named after its presumably largest member 1734 Zhongolovich. The Dora family may also contain a subfamily.

It orbits the Sun at a distance of 2.3–3.3 AU once every 4 years and 8 months (1,697 days). Its orbit has an eccentricity of 0.19 and an inclination of 7° with respect to the ecliptic.

== Physical characteristics ==
Komarov is characterized as a dark C-type asteroid by Pan-STARRS photometric survey. It is also classified as a hydrated Ch-subtype in the SMASS classification scheme.

=== Diameter and albedo ===
According to the surveys carried out by the Japanese Akari satellite and NASA's Wide-field Infrared Survey Explorer with its subsequent NEOWISE mission, Komarov measures between 21.55 and 25.40 kilometers in diameter and its surface has an albedo between 0.042 and 0.103. The Collaborative Asteroid Lightcurve Link assumes a standard albedo for carbonaceous asteroids of 0.057 and calculates a diameter of 21.16 kilometers based on an absolute magnitude of 12.1.

=== Lightcurves ===
In July 2008, two rotational lightcurve of Komarov were independently obtained from photometric observations by astronomers Julian Oey and Peter Caspari. Lightcurve analysis gave a rotation period of 8.8015 and 9.695 hours with a brightness amplitude of 0.39 and 0.56 magnitude, respectively (U=3/2+).

== Naming ==
This minor planet was named in honor of Vladimir Komarov (1927–1967), Soviet cosmonaut who headed the crewed flight on the Voskhod spacecraft. He was killed when the Soyuz 1 space capsule crashed after re-entry on 24 April 1967, due to a parachute failure. The official naming citation was published by the Minor Planet Center on 1 June 1975 (M.P.C. 3825).
