= Georgy Katys =

Soviet cosmonaut (1926–2017)

Georgi Petrovich Katys (Russian: Георгий Петрович Катыс; 31 August 1926 – 7 August 2017) was a Soviet cosmonaut.

Georgi Katys was born on 31 August 1926. Candidate of technical sciences degree from Bauman Moscow Higher Technical School, Moscow 1953. He was selected as a cosmonaut on 28 May 1964. Later he became the chief of AN cosmonaut group. He was assigned as for Voskhod 1.

He was involved in the development of Lunokhod, the Soviet Moon Rover. Since 1984, a Professor at Moscow State Institute of Radio Engineering, Electronics and Automation. He was also a member of Russian Academy of Sciences and of the Academy of Cosmonautics.
