= Vladimir Komarov =

Soviet test pilot (1927–1967)

- Владимир Комаров
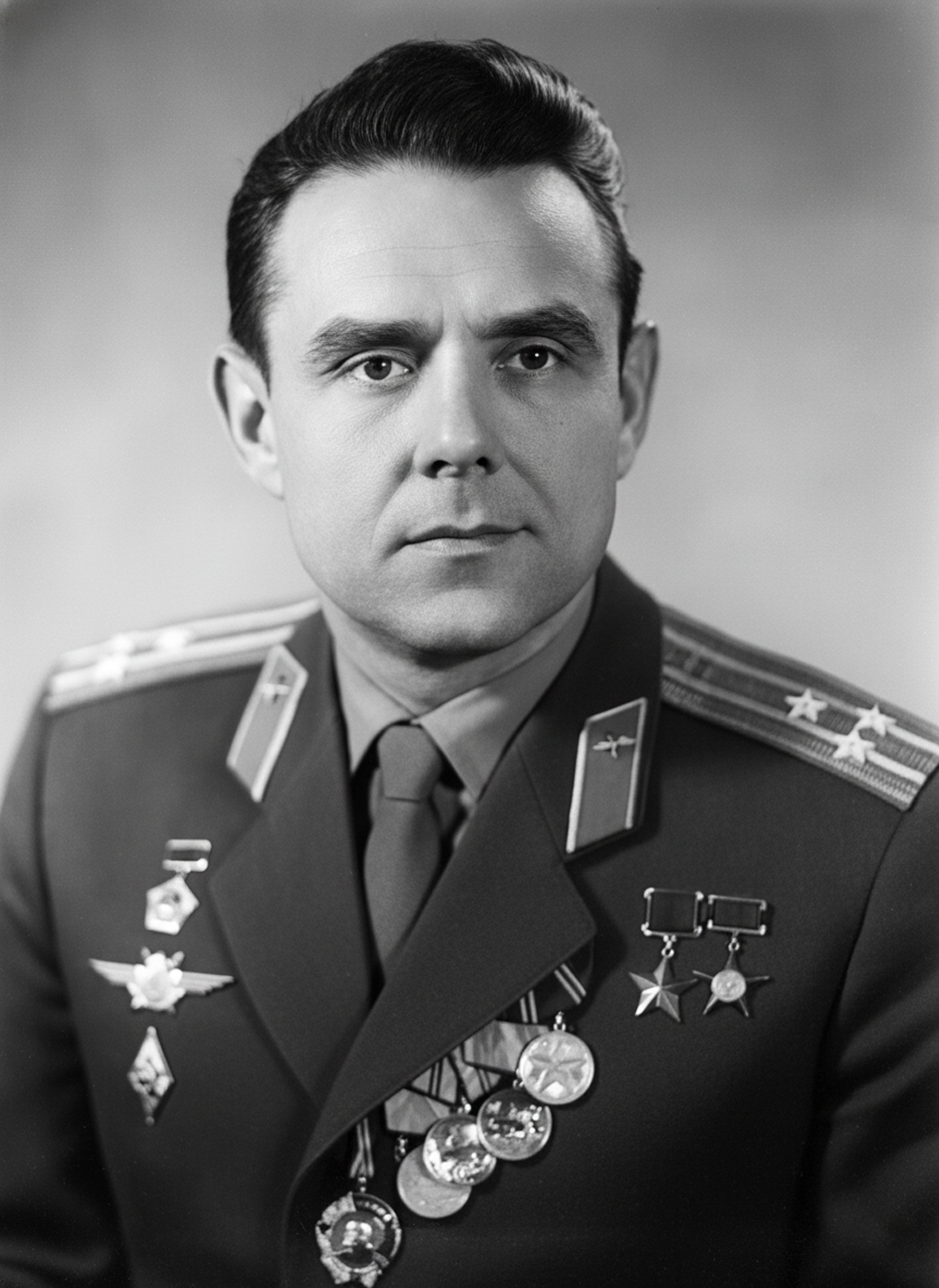
- Komarov in 1965
- Born: 16 March 1927; Moscow, Soviet Union
- Died: 24 April 1967 (aged 40); Orenburg Oblast, Soviet Union
- Resting place: Kremlin Wall Necropolis
- Occupation: Engineer
- Spouse: Valentina Kiselyova (m. 1950)
- Children: 2
- Awards: Hero of the Soviet Union (twice)
- Space career

Cosmonaut
- Rank: Polkovnik (equiv. Colonel), Soviet Air Force
- Time in space: 2d 03h 04m
- Selection: Air Force Group 1
- Missions: Voskhod 1, Soyuz 1

Signature
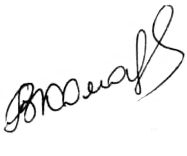

Vladimir Mikhaylovich Komarov (Note: In this name that follows East Slavic naming customs, the patronymic is Mikhaylovich and the family name is Komarov.) (Russian: Владимир Михайлович Комаров, IPA: [vlɐˈdʲimʲɪr mʲɪˈxajləvʲɪtɕ kəmɐˈrof]; 16 March 1927 – 24 April 1967) was a Soviet test pilot, aerospace engineer, and cosmonaut. In October 1964, he commanded Voskhod 1, the first spaceflight to carry more than one crew member. He became the first Soviet cosmonaut to fly in space twice when he was selected as the solo pilot of Soyuz 1, its first crewed test flight. A parachute failure caused his Soyuz capsule to crash into the ground after re-entry on 24 April 1967, making him the first human to die in a space flight incident.

He was declared medically unfit for training or spaceflight twice while in the program but continued playing an active role. During his time at the cosmonaut training center, he contributed to space vehicle design, cosmonaut training, evaluation and public relations.

== Early life ==
Komarov was born on 16 March 1927 in Moscow and grew up with his half-sister Matilda (born in 1915). His father was a labourer who worked at various low-paid jobs to support the family. In 1935, Komarov began his formal education in the local elementary school. Here he showed a natural aptitude for mathematics. In 1941, Komarov left school because of World War II and the German invasion of the Soviet Union, and became a laborer on a collective farm. He showed an interest in aeronautics from an early age, and collected magazines and pictures about aviation, in addition to making model aircraft and his own propeller. At the age of fifteen in 1942, Komarov entered the "1st Moscow Special Air Force School" to pursue his dream of becoming an aviator. Shortly thereafter, his family learned that Komarov's father had been killed in an "unknown war action". Because of the German invasion, the flight school soon had to be moved to the Tyumen region in Siberia for the duration of the war. Students there learned a wide variety of subjects besides aviation—including zoology and foreign languages. In 1945, Komarov graduated from flight school with honors. World War II hostilities ended before Komarov was called on to enter combat.

In 1946, Komarov completed his first year of training at the Chkalov Higher Air Force School in Borisoglebsk in Voronezh Oblast. He then completed his training at the A.K. Serov Military Aviation College in Bataisk. Komarov's mother died in 1948, seven months before his graduation in 1949, at which he received his pilot's wings and commission as a lieutenant in the Soviet Air Force.

== Career in the Soviet Air Force ==
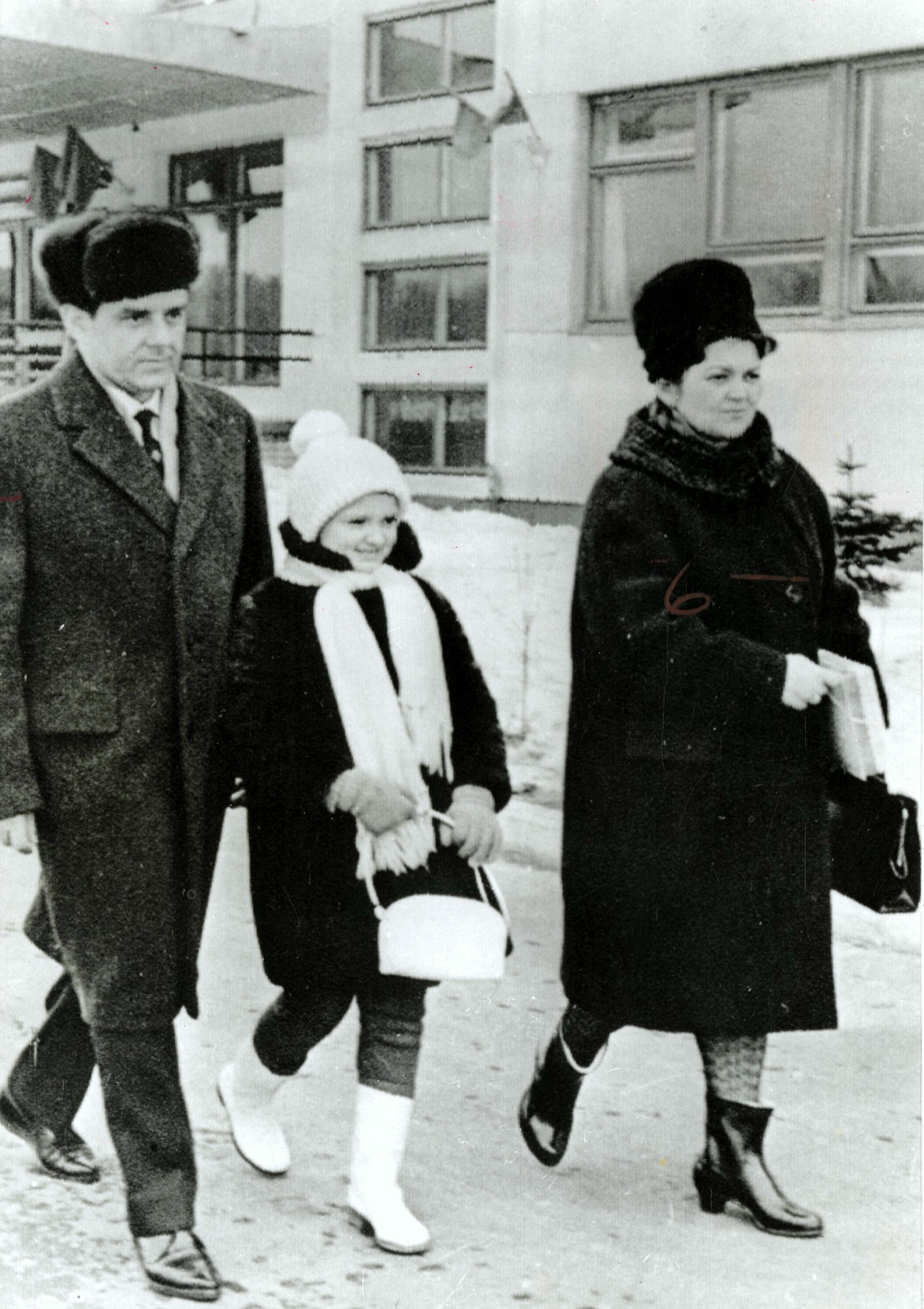
Komarov with his wife Valentina Yakovlevna and daughter Irina

In December 1949, Komarov served as the pilot of a fighter plane with the 383rd Regiment of the 42nd North Caucasian Fighter Air Division that was based in Grozny.

Komarov married Valentina Yakovlevna Kiselyova in October 1950. He was promoted to senior lieutenant in 1952, and was later assigned as the chief pilot of the 486th Fighter Aviation Regiment of the 279th Fighter Air Division in the Prikarpate Region. Komarov continued to fly in that position until 1954, and then enrolled in an engineering course at the Zhukovsky Air Force Engineering Academy. In 1959, Komarov was promoted to the rank of senior engineer-lieutenant. Later that year he achieved his goal of becoming a test pilot at the Central Scientific Research Institute at Chkalovsky.

== Cosmonaut selection ==
=== Air Force Group One ===
In September 1959, Komarov was promoted to engineer-captain and invited to participate in the selection process for cosmonaut candidate along with approximately 3,000 other pilots. He was one of twenty candidates selected for "Air Force Group One"; he and the others reported to the newly formed TsPK (Yuri Gagarin Cosmonaut Training Center) just outside Moscow for assignment on 13 March 1960.

Although eminently qualified, Komarov was not chosen in the top six candidates, because he did not meet the age, height, and weight restrictions specified by the Chief Designer of Russia's space program, Sergei Korolev. "If the criteria had been different," the cosmonaut trainer Mark Gallai noted in an interview, "Certainly Komarov, who was very intelligent, would have been in the group. He had Air Force Academy flight experience. He greatly influenced the design of the 'Vostok' and [the] 'Voskhod'." At age 32, Komarov was the second oldest of the pilots chosen; Korolev had specified a maximum age of 27. Only two members of the first group, Pavel Belyayev (Voskhod 2) and Komarov himself, were also graduates of the Soviet Air Force Academy. In addition, only Komarov had experience as a flight test engineer on new aircraft.

=== Training ===
Shortly after beginning his training Komarov was hospitalised for a minor operation in May 1960, which left him medically unfit for physical training for approximately six months. At the time, the selection criteria placed a heavy emphasis on the physical condition of cosmonauts and any imperfection led to instant disqualification. Since Komarov already held engineering qualifications, he was allowed to remain in the program after assuring the administration he would be able to catch up. He continued with the required academic studies while recovering. He returned to training in October, because his recovery was more rapid than medical staff had expected. During that time he assisted his younger peers with their academic studies, earning him the casual nickname of "The Professor," which he shared with Belyayev, who was two years his senior. In 1961 the first space flights began. By 1962, Komarov was the third-highest-paid cosmonaut, due to his qualifications, rank and experience. He earned 528 rubles a month, with only cosmonauts 1 and 2, Yuri Gagarin and Gherman Titov, being more highly paid.

When Georgi Shonin demonstrated an unacceptable level of g-force susceptibility in the centrifuge, Komarov replaced him in May 1962 for planned dual Vostok missions. Komarov was selected as backup for Pavel Popovich (Vostok 4), but subsequent routine ECG testing of Komarov revealed a heart irregularity and he was pulled from the program and replaced by Boris Volynov. The same heart irregularity grounded American astronaut Deke Slayton. After Komarov persistently lobbied medical and military personnel for re-admittance to the program, they allowed him to return to training.

In 1963, cosmonaut training was conducted in six Groups, with Komarov being selected in Group 2 with Valery Bykovsky and Volynov. This group was to train for missions of up to five days in duration scheduled for the latter part of 1963. In May 1963, Alekseyev proposed to General Kamanin that Komarov be named backup for Vostok 5 rather than Khrunov because his suit was ready. Komarov was later named in a further group for planned missions in 1964 with Belyaev, Shonin, Khrunov, Zaikin, Gorbatko, Volynov, and Leonov. The training groups were formed for later Vostok missions (Vostok 7–13), but no actual crews were assigned and the missions did not occur under the auspices of the original Vostok program. In December 1963, Komarov was shortlisted for flight by Kamanin with Volynov and Leonov, having completed two years of training.

In April 1964 Komarov was declared space-flight ready with Bykovsky, Popovich, Titov, Volynov, Leonov, Khrunov, Belyayev, and Lev Demin. From this group the commander of the planned Voskhod mission scheduled for late 1964 would be chosen. In May the group was reduced to Volynov, Komarov, Leonov and Khrunov.

During training, Komarov lived at the TsPK with his wife Valentina and their two children Yevgeny and Irina. There, he enjoyed hunting, cross country skiing, ice hockey, and other social activities with his fellow trainees in their leisure time. Komarov was well liked by his peers, who referred to him as Volodya (a diminutive of his first name). Pavel Popovich noted that Komarov was respected for his humility and experience: "he was already an engineer when he joined us, but he never looked down on the others. He was warm-hearted, purposeful and industrious. Volodya's prestige was so high that people came to him to discuss all questions: personal as well as questions of our work." Fellow cosmonaut Alexei Leonov described him as "very serious. He was a first-class test pilot."

== Spaceflights ==
=== Voskhod 1 ===
By July 1964, only seven cosmonauts remained eligible for the Voskhod crew after some were disqualified on medical grounds. On 6 July, Komarov was named as the commander of the back-up crew for Voskhod 1. After several months of much heated debate between Kamanin and Korolev over the selection of the crew, Komarov was named as prime crew commander by the State Commission on 4 October 1964, just eight days before its scheduled launch. Kamanin played tennis with the Voskhod crew that evening and noted that Komarov played poorly in comparison to his crew: Boris Yegorov and Konstantin Feoktistov.

On 9 October, Komarov and the crew inspected the Voskhod with Korolev and other members of the administration. Later that day they were interviewed by the state press and played tennis for the benefit of photographers.

On the morning of 11 October, Komarov was given various communist relics to take with him into space the following day. In the afternoon the crew again inspected the capsule and were given their final instructions by Korolev. Komarov was the only member of the crew to have undertaken extensive training and was the only member with any flight experience; the two other crewmen being civilians. His call sign was "Ruby" (Russian: Рубин).

During the mission Komarov performed various tasks with the other crew members, including medical and navigational tests and observing the Aurora Borealis. Komarov alone carried out tests with ion thrusters that had been attached to the Voskhod. He also made a number of radio transmissions, including a greeting to the Tokyo Olympics, which had opened on 10 October. The mission lasted just over twenty-four hours. After the crew landed safely they were flown back to the launch site at Tyuratam (also known as Baikonur to disguise its true location). Kamanin noted in his diary that while his crew were in good spirits, Komarov was fatigued. On 19 October, Komarov and his crew made reports in Red Square and attended an audience at the Kremlin. After the success of this short but scientifically important mission he was promoted to colonel. The success of the mission earned Komarov the awards of the Order of Lenin and Hero of the Soviet Union.

In December 1964, the RVSN (Strategic Rocket Forces) requested that Komarov be transferred from the VVS (Soviet Air Force) to the RVSN, in a move possibly motivated by the poor record of the RVSN in producing successful rockets compared to the VVS. The request was opposed by Kamanin.

In 1965, Komarov worked with Gagarin in supervising preparations for the flight of Voskhod 2, which carried out the first attempt of an extravehicular activity in outer space. These preparations included fitting of space suits on the cosmonauts and briefings for the spaceflight. In April of that year, Komarov toured Leningrad with Kamanin, Gagarin, Titov, Belyayev, and Leonov. Komarov also visited Petropavlovsk Fortress with Valentin Glushko where Glushko had conducted early rocket experiments in the early 1930s. In September that year, Komarov toured West Germany.

=== Soyuz 1 ===
Komarov was assigned to the Soviet Soyuz program along with Gagarin and Leonov. In July 1966, Komarov was reprimanded by Kamanin for his unauthorised disclosure, while in Japan, that "the Soviet Union will, at the scheduled time, fly an automated spacecraft around the Moon and return it to (the) Earth, to be followed by a dog flight, then a manned circumlunar flight." The following month Komarov clashed with other engineers over ongoing design problems in which zero-G tests showed that the Soyuz module hatch was too small to allow the safe exit of a fully suited cosmonaut. Meanwhile, Komarov and his fellow cosmonauts had their groups and assignments constantly revised, and they became increasingly anxious about the lack of response to their concerns about the design and manufacture of the spacecraft, which Gagarin had raised in a letter on their behalf to Leonid Brezhnev.

Komarov was selected to command the Soyuz 1, in 1967, with Gagarin as his backup cosmonaut. During the preparations for the spaceflight, both cosmonauts were working twelve- to fourteen-hour days. On orbital insertion, the solar panels of the Soyuz module failed to fully deploy thereby preventing the craft from being fully powered and obscuring some of the navigation equipment. Komarov reported: "Conditions are poor. The cabin parameters are normal, but the left solar panel didn't deploy. The electrical bus is at only 13 to 14 amperes. The HF (high frequency) communications are not working. I cannot orient the spacecraft to the sun. I tried orienting the spacecraft manually using the DO-1 orientation engines, but the pressure remaining on the DO-1 has gone down to 180." Komarov tried unsuccessfully to orient the Soyuz module for five hours. The craft was transmitting unreliable status information, and lost communications on orbits 13 through 15 due to the failure of the high frequency transmitter that should have maintained radio contact while the craft was out of range of the ultra high frequency (UHF) ground receivers.

As a result of the problems with the craft, the Soviets did not launch the second Soyuz module, from which cosmonauts were to perform an extra-vehicular activity (EVA) to the Soyuz 1, and cut the mission short.

Komarov was ordered to re-orient the craft using the ion flow sensors on orbits 15 to 17. The ion sensors failed. Komarov did not have enough time to attempt a manual re-entry until orbit 19. Manual orientation relied on using the equipped Vzor periscope device, but to do this, Komarov had to be able to see the Sun. To reach the designated landing site at Orsk, the retro-fire had to take place on the night side of the Earth. Komarov oriented the spacecraft manually on the dayside then used the gyro-platform as a reference so that he could orient the craft for a night side retro-fire. He successfully re-entered the Earth's atmosphere on his 19th orbit, but the module's drogue and main braking parachute failed to deploy correctly. The module crashed into the ground at terminal velocity, killing Komarov, at 6.24 a.m.

During interviews, former KGB agent Venyamin Russayev made claims contested by some space historians. Among them, Russayev claimed that prior to the launch, Soyuz 1 engineers reported 203 design faults to party leaders, but their concerns "were overruled by political pressures for a series of space feats to mark the anniversary of Lenin's birthday". He also claimed that Yuri Gagarin was the backup pilot for Soyuz 1, and was aware of the design problems and the pressures from the Politburo to proceed with the flight, and that Gagarin attempted to "bump" Komarov from the mission, knowing that the Soviet leadership would not risk a national hero on the flight. At the same time, he claimed that Komarov refused to pass on the mission, even though he believed it to be doomed, explained that he could not risk Gagarin's life.

== Response to Komarov's death ==
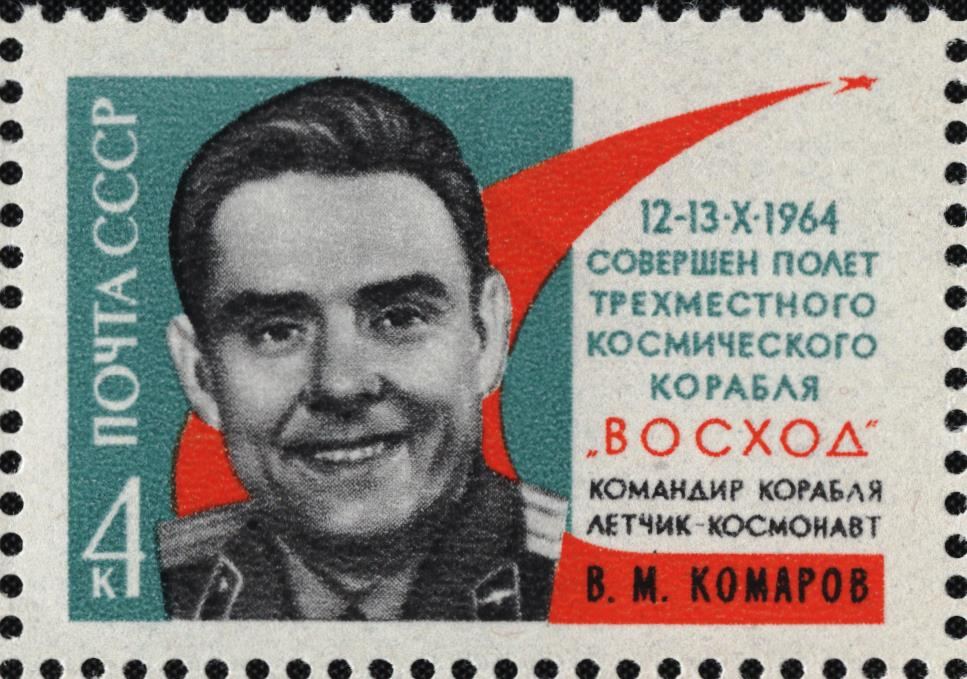
1964 USSR postage stamp honoring Vladimir Komarov

In his diary, Kamanin recorded that the Soyuz 1 capsule crashed into the ground at 30–40 metres per second (98–131 ft/s) and that the remains of Komarov's body were an irregular lump 30 centimetres (12 in) in diameter and 80 centimetres (31 in) long. Three hours after the capsule's crash, Keldysh, Tyulin, Rudenko, and other State Commission members visited the site. At 21:45 Kamanin accompanied Komarov's remains to the Orsk aerodrome, where they were loaded on an Il-18. Ten minutes before departure an An-12 landed with Kuznetsov and several cosmonauts. Kamanin's aircraft arrived in Moscow in the early hours of the next morning. The aircraft had to divert to Sheremetyevo since all the other airfields around Moscow were closed to takeoffs or landings due to weather. Konstantin Vershinin's orders were that Komarov's remains were to be photographed, then immediately cremated so that a state burial in the Kremlin wall could take place. The remains underwent a quick autopsy that morning, then were cremated.

On 25 April, a response to Komarov's death by his fellow cosmonauts was published in Pravda: "For the forerunners it is always more difficult. They tread the unknown paths and these paths are not straight, they have sharp turns, surprises and dangers. But anyone who takes the pathway into orbit never wants to leave it. And no matter what difficulties or obstacles there are, they are never strong enough to deflect such a man from his chosen path. While his heart beats in his chest, a cosmonaut will always continue to challenge the universe. Vladimir Komarov was one of the first on this treacherous path." When interviewed on 17 May by the newspaper Komsomolskaya Pravda, Gagarin alluded to the failure of the administration to listen to the concerns about the Soyuz module that the cosmonaut corps had identified, and maintained that Komarov's death should teach the establishment to be more rigorous in its testing and evaluation of "all the mechanisms of the spaceship, even more attentive to all stages of checking and testing, even more vigilant in our encounter with the unknown. He has shown us how dangerous the pathway to space is. His flight and his death will teach us courage." In May 1967, Gagarin and Leonov criticised program head Vasily Mishin's "poor knowledge of the Soyuz spacecraft and the details of its operation, his lack of cooperation in working with the cosmonauts in flight and training activities," and asked Kamanin to cite him in the official crash report.

== Honours and awards ==
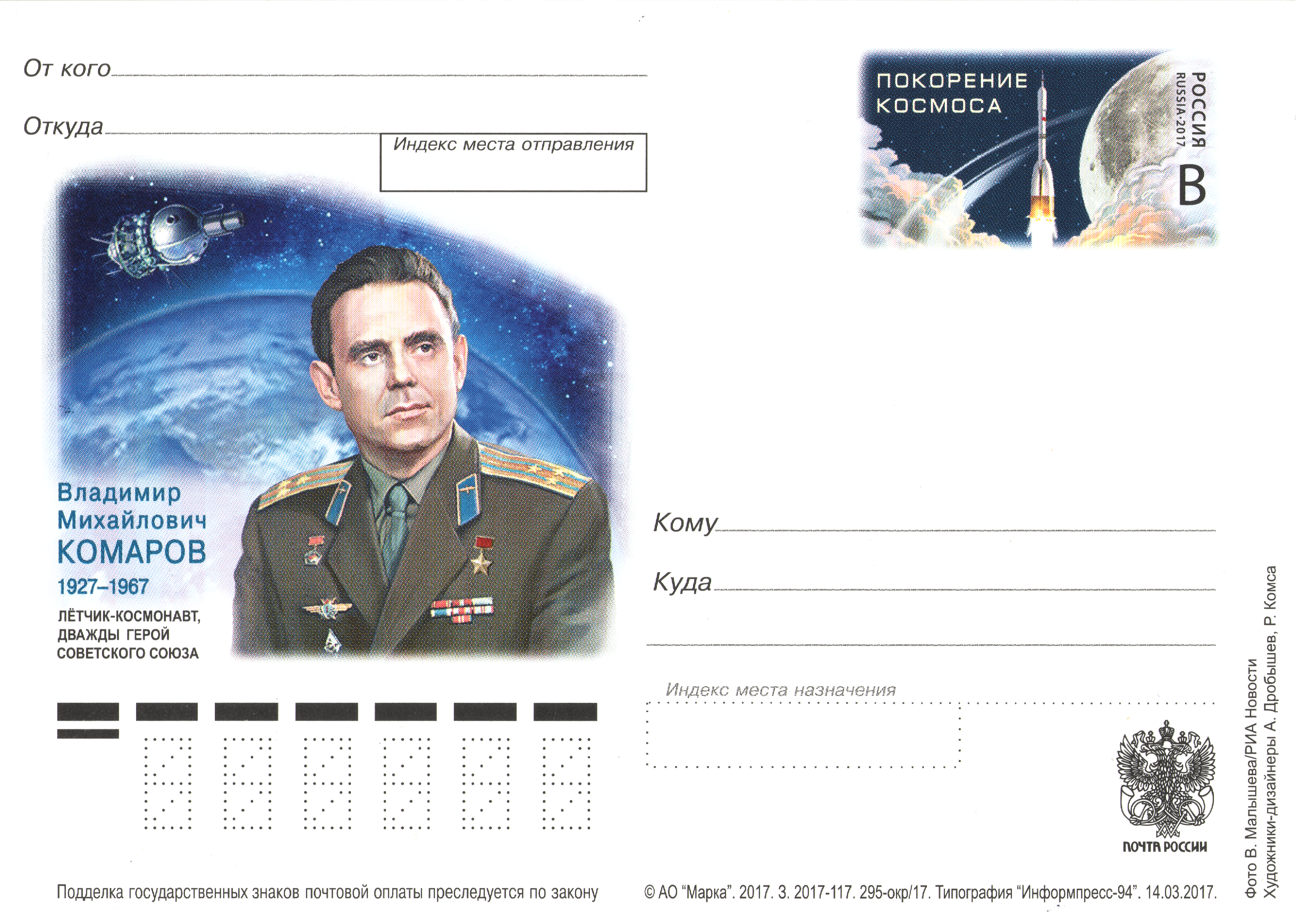
Postal card of Russia depicting Vladimir Komarov

- Gold Star Hero of the Soviet Union, twice (19 October 1964, 1967 (posthumously))
- Order of Lenin (19 October 1964, 1967 (posthumously))
- Order of the Red Star (1961)
- Medal "For Combat Merit" (1956)
- Medal "For the Development of Virgin Lands" (1964)
- Pilot-Cosmonaut of the USSR
- Hero of Socialist Labour (North Vietnam, 1964)

=== Posthumous honours ===
On 26 April 1967, Komarov was given a state funeral in Moscow, and his ashes were interred in the Kremlin Wall Necropolis at Red Square. The American astronauts requested the Soviet government to allow a representative to attend, but were turned down.

Komarov was posthumously awarded his second Order of Lenin and also Hero of the Soviet Union.

On 25 April 1968, a memorial service was held for Komarov at the crash site near Orsk 51°21′41.67″N 59°33′44.75″E. Kamanin noted in his diary that over 10,000 people were present at this service, "some driving hundreds of kilometres for the event."

Komarov is commemorated with other prominent figures from the early Russian space program with a bust on Cosmonauts Alley in Moscow, and he is also honored with a monument at the crash site near Orsk.

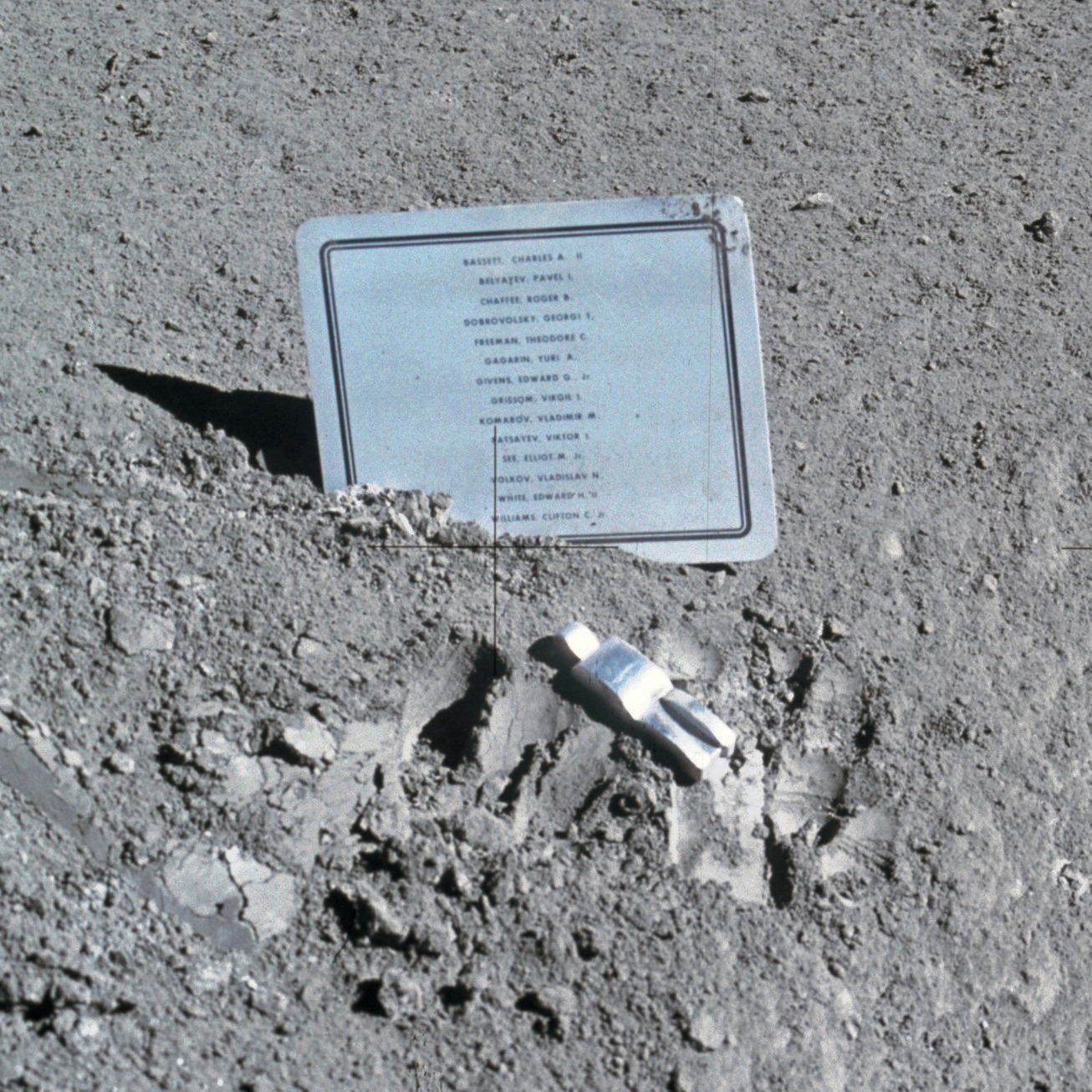
Commemorative plaque and the Fallen Astronaut sculpture left on the Moon during the 1971 Apollo 15 mission.

Before leaving the Moon on Apollo 11's Lunar Module, Neil Armstrong's final task was to place a small package of memorial items to honor Soviet cosmonauts Komarov, Yuri Gagarin, and the Apollo 1 astronauts Gus Grissom, Ed White, and Roger Chaffee. Komarov's name also appears on a commemorative plaque left at Hadley Rille on the Moon by David Scott, commander of Apollo 15, in memory of 14 deceased NASA astronauts and USSR cosmonauts, along with a small sculpture entitled Fallen Astronaut, on 1 August 1971. This plaque and the sculpture represent those astronauts and cosmonauts who died in the quest to reach outer space and the Moon.

The asteroid 1836 Komarov, discovered in 1971, was named in the honor of Komarov, as was a crater on the Moon. This asteroid and the cosmonaut inspired the composer Brett Dean to write a piece of symphonic music commissioned by conductor Simon Rattle in 2006. The composition is named Komarov's Fall, and it can be found on the EMI Classics Album of Simon Rattle's The Planets.

The Fédération Aéronautique Internationale's V.M. Komarov Diploma is named in Komarov's honor.

There was formerly a Soviet satellite-tracking ship named for Komarov, the Kosmonaut Vladimir Komarov.

== See also ==
- Apollo 1
- Re-entry accidents
- Soyuz 11
- Space Shuttle Columbia disaster
