= Voskhod Spacecraft "Globus" IMP navigation instrument =

Soviet and Russian spacecraft navigation system

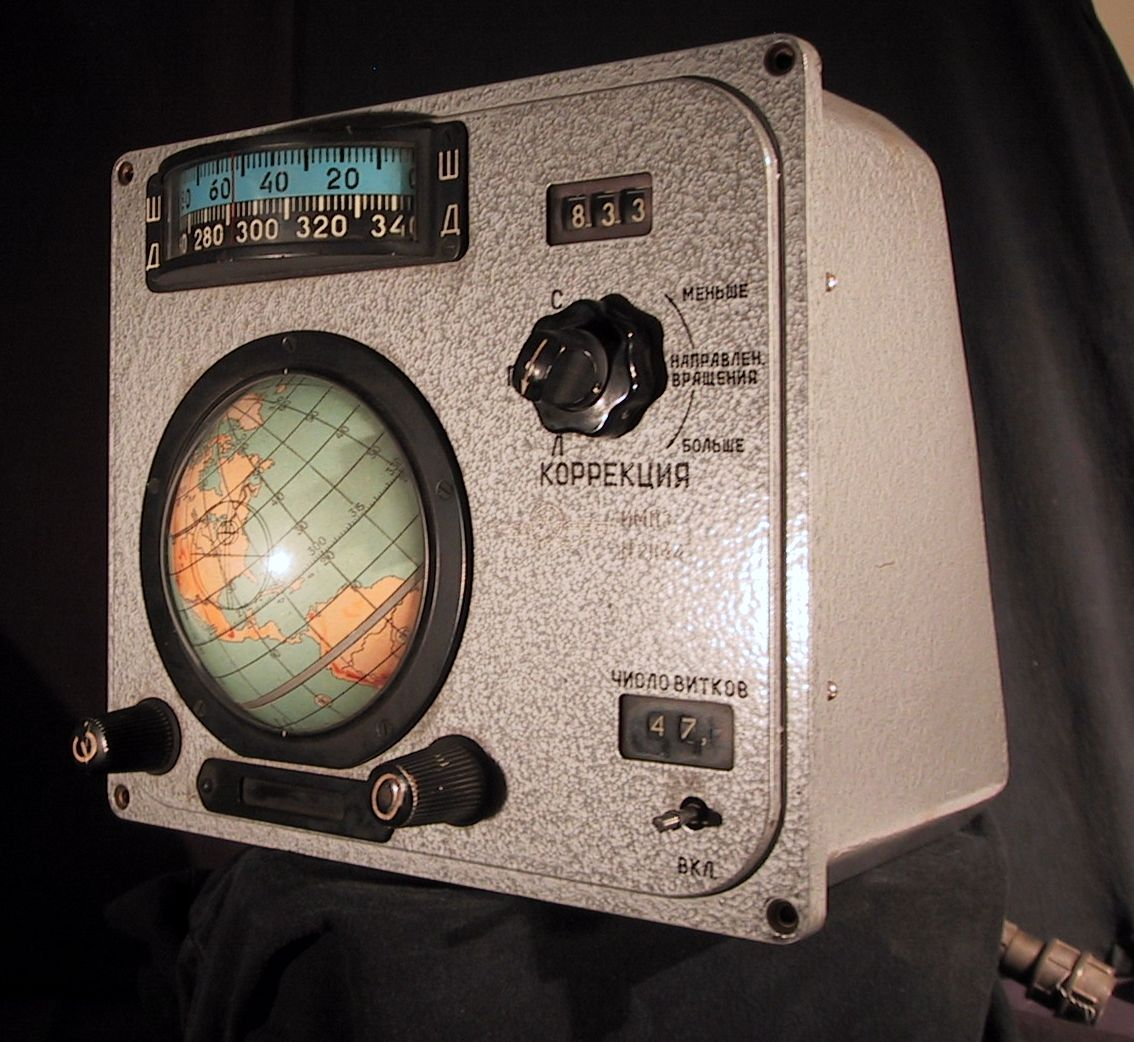
IMP Globus instrument

Globus IMP instruments were spacecraft navigation instruments used in Soviet and Russian crewed spacecraft. The IMP acronym stems from the Russian expression индикатор местоположения (indicator of position in flight), but the instrument is informally referred to as the Globus. It displays the nadir of the spacecraft on a rotating terrestrial globe. It functions as an onboard, autonomous indicator of the spacecraft's location relative to Earth coordinates. An electro-mechanical device in the tradition of complex post-World War II clocks such as master clocks, the Globus IMP instrument incorporates hundreds of mechanical components common to horology. This instrument is a mechanical computer for navigation akin to the Norden bombsight. It mechanically computes complex functions and displays its output through mechanical displacements of the globe and other indicator components. It also modulates electric signals from other instruments.

The IMP, in successively developing versions, has been used in Soviet and Russian crewed space missions ever since the world's first crewed spaceflight (Yuri Gagarin, 12 April 1961) through every crewed Vostok, Voskhod and Soyuz mission until 2002.

This article specifically covers IMP Version 3, used in Voskhod 1, since Version 3 has been more extensively documented than earlier versions used during the Vostok missions and subsequent versions for the more complex Soyuz. However, all versions of the IMP were relatively similar with respect to design, purpose and operation.

== Context and purpose ==
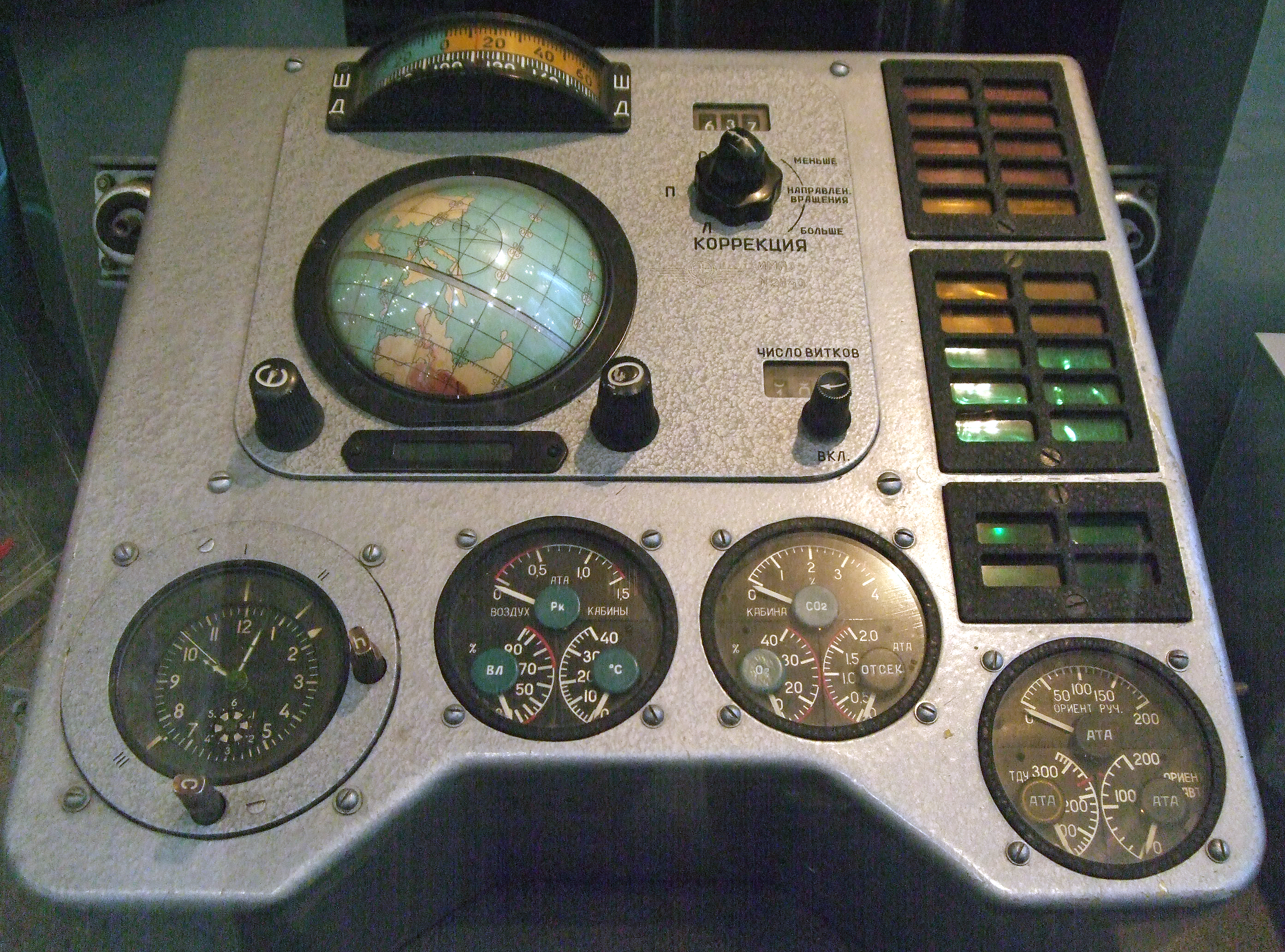
A IMP Globus instrument within the Voskhod navigation panel

The Voskhod spacecraft was the second generation of spacecraft designed in the crewed Soviet space program, essentially an adaptation of the earlier Vostok spacecraft. It flew two crewed missions, Voskhod 1 (world's first multi-crewed mission, launched on 12 October 1964) and Voskhod 2 (featuring the world's first Extra-vehicular activity, or EVA, commonly called a spacewalk, launched on March 18, 1965). The Voskhod spacecraft—and its Globus IMP instruments—is a close derivative of Vostok, which flew six Soviet individuals to low Earth orbit, including the world's first human in space, Yuri Gagarin, and the world's first woman in space, Valentina Tereshkova. The main difference between IMP versions 1 and 2 (Vostok spacecraft) and later versions (Voskhod and Soyuz) is the addition of the disc-shaped longitude and latitude indicators.

The design objectives for the IMP were to compute and display the geographic coordinates at the spacecraft's nadir, i.e. which point on Earth's surface it was overflying. The Globus displayed this data to the crew, and also transmitted electrical data to other systems through a variable resistance and cam-activated switching.

Derivatives of Vostok's and Voskhod's IMP have been flown on every Soyuz spacecraft up to the last of the Soyuz TM mission in April 2002. The main functional addition to IMP versions designed for Soyuz was the ability to manually change the orbit inclination. On Vostok and Voskhod, the inclination to the equator had been constant at 65 degrees by virtue of the booster design limitations and the geographical location of the Baikonur Cosmodrome from which every Soviet and Russian crewed mission had been launched to date, so there was no need to implement inclination modulation into versions 1 to 4 of the IMP.

The Soyuz TMA spacecraft and its successors now provide similar functions to the Globus using a computerized world map on a computer display.

The Russian early missions were mostly automated and controlled from the mission control center (the TsUP). The spacecraft essentially controlled itself, and the cosmonauts were expected to initiate maneuvers or corrections only after approval from the TsUP and according to its data and parameters. Therefore, the instrumentation available to the pilot was minimal and its operational relevance was limited to contingency scenarios as much as possible. The readings from the IMP were primarily intended to help cosmonaut pilots confirm that the automated flight sequencer was operating normally. The data would also keep the crew aware of their position when they were orbiting over the nighttime part of the Earth, or when the spacecraft's viewports and Vzor periscope couldn't be pointed toward the ground.

However, the IMP would become crucial if manual retrorocket activation became compromised by failure of either the flight sequencer or communications with mission control, as did happen on Voskhod 2. Furthermore, given the scarcity of Soviet communication stations on Earth, the cosmonauts spent most of their time out of range with ground control and needed instruments to assess their position relative to the ground.

By contrast, the US crewed space programs used a similar, mechanical positional indicator only during two of its early Mercury missions before discarding it. By 1961 under project Project Gemini the US crewed space program changed to fully autonomous digital computerized systems. These systems consisted of gyro platform, digital computer and fly-by-wire systems. The first being the Gemini Guidance Computer. The computer was architecturally similar to the Saturn Launch Vehicle Digital Computer, in particular in the instruction set; however its circuit integration was less advanced. Later, for the Apollo program NASA, under the lead of MIT's Instrument Laboratory will use the first digital computer using integrated circuits, the Apollo Guidance Computer.

== Structure and materials ==
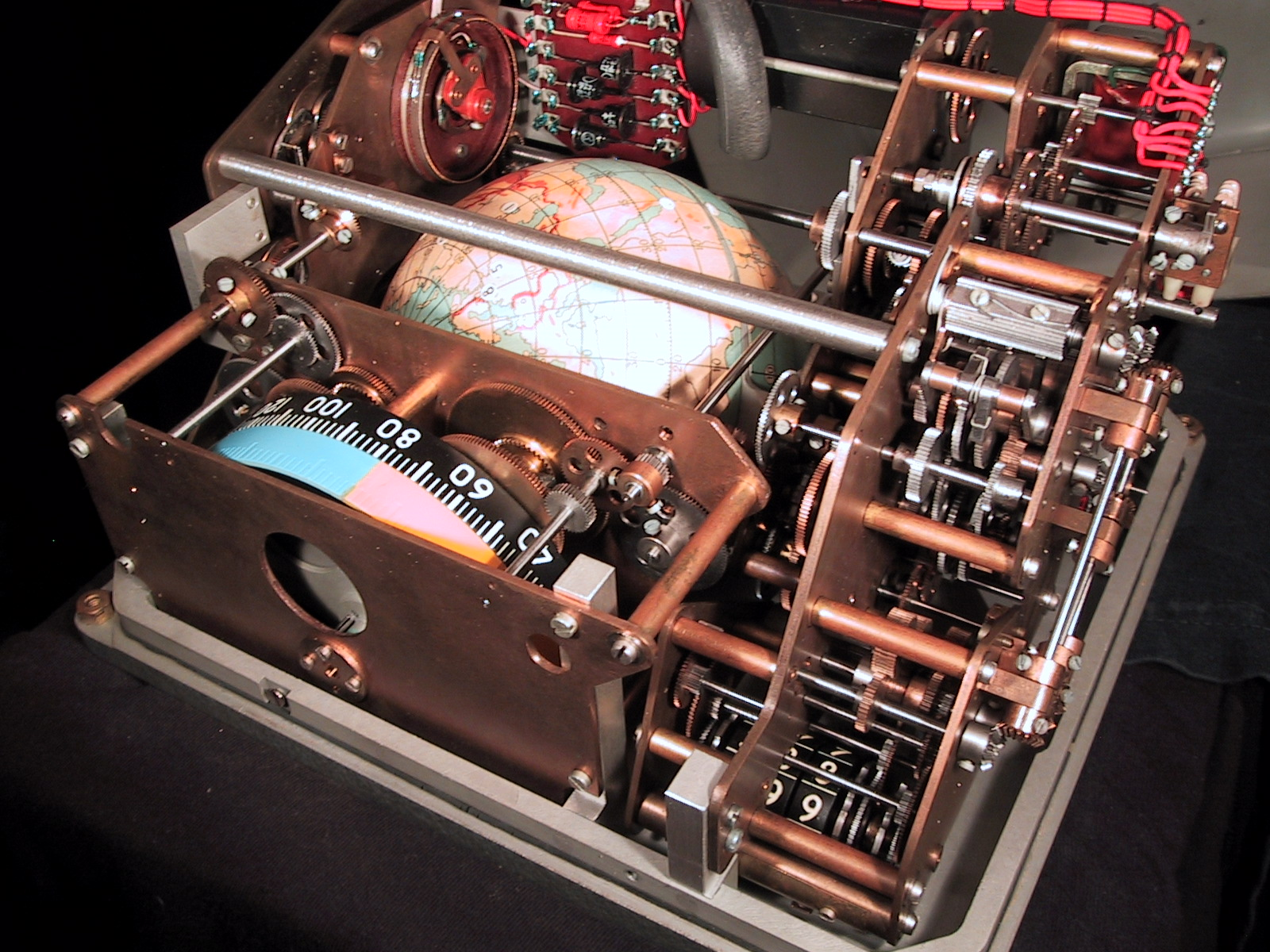
IMP Globus, inside view

Two main instrument panels were used for Vostok and Voskhod: a control panel with switches and rotary controllers, and an instrument display panel (IDS, for Instrument Display System). On Vostok and Soyuz spacecraft, the IDS Panel sits in front of the cosmonauts, above the Vzor periscope screen. As for Voskhod 1 and Voskhod 2 however, mission design compromises forced upon the designers for propaganda motivations had the cosmonauts' seats rotated 90 degrees clockwise, making the reading and setting of the IDS panel less convenient.

Designed to be integrated into a niche in the instrument display panel, the IMP instrument's volume was about that of a big toaster. It was the prominent feature of the IDS panel. The front panel of the IMP instrument served as the structural support for all other components; it was made of thick, machined aluminum alloy with structural protrusions. The mechanical components were made of brass, steel and aluminum; the globe itself was made of aluminum covered with printed paper, a typical technique for the manufacture of terrestrial globes. The enclosing cover was made of a sheet of aluminum alloy cut and soldered to shape.

Like most of early spacecraft's cockpit instruments, the IMP Globus was designed and tested to remain operative in a complete vacuum, in case of an accidental depressurization of the cabin.

== Displays and settings ==
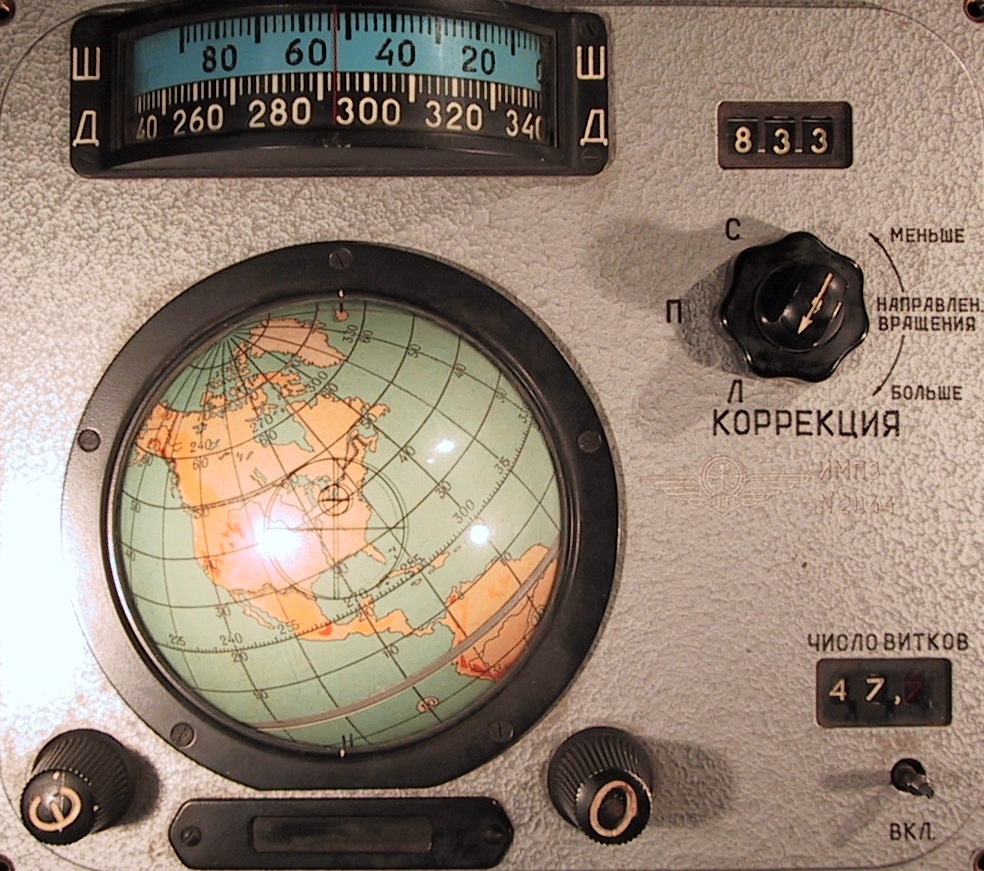
Displays and settings

=== Displays ===
- A terrestrial globe, with a diameter of 12.7 cm (5 inches), which approximate a 1:100,000,000 scale, moving in two degrees of freedom (rotation and inclination);
- Two disc-shaped indicators, one each for longitude and latitude, with markings in degrees on their edges;
- An orbit counter labelled ЧИСЛО ВИТКОВ (Number of revolutions) with three digits: two white digits for orbits and one red digit for fraction of an orbit;
- A backlit indicator below the globe that, when illuminated, displayed the text МЕСТО ПОСАДКИ (Landing Place).

=== Pilot settings ===
- One switch (on the separate Control panel) activates the instrument;
- One switch (on the separate Control panel) activates a motor which displaces the indicators from the actual position relative to the Earth to the projected point of landing position, or vice versa
- Two concentric knobs conjointly labelled КОРРЕКЦИЯ (Correction). The inner knob is simply labelled С, П and Л (Center, Right and Left). Selecting one of these three positions mechanically assigns the outer knob, labelled НАПРАВЛЕНИЕ ВРАЩЕНИЯ, МЕНЬШЕ and БОЛЬШЕ (Direction of rotation, Less and More) to preset one of three orbital parameters; and three corresponding one-digit indicators;
- One knob marked Э presets or resets the indicators longitude position, i.e. in the equatorial plane;
- One knob marked О presets or resets the indicators' position along the orbit;
- One knob (missing in the picture) presets or resets the orbit counter.

== Functions displayed ==
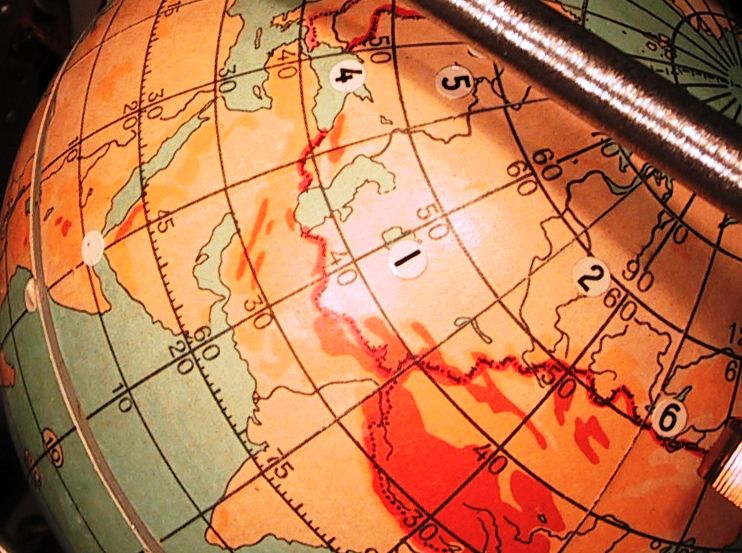
Globe with numbered bullets indicating Earth communication stations

The moving terrestrial globe was protected by a hemispherical transparent plastic dome, on which was engraved and printed a cross-shaped sight. Under normal operations, the point visible under the cross was the point on Earth which was directly under the spacecraft at any given time. A second mode of operation, activated by the cosmonauts, advanced the globe to a position where the spacecraft would land should the retrorockets be fired at that moment to effect the reentry sequence, which also lit the место посадки indicator. The latitude and longitude indicators followed these two modes of operation as well.

At least one Voskhod IMP's globe was customized with white paper bullets numbered from 1 to 8, along with unnumbered bullets. Those relate to radio communication centers linked with Mission Control in Moscow. The unnumbered bullets refer to space control-monitoring ships.

== Operation ==
Prior to launch, latitude and longitude were adjusted to the precalculated coordinates of entering orbit. Right after the launch phase, once the orbit was established, its parameters were precisely measured by radar and radio telemetry from the ground. Revised settings for the IMP were then computed on the ground and communicated to the crew, which reset the instrument's three orbital Correction parameters, the equatorial longitude and the present point in the orbit using the two КОРРЕКЦИЯ knobs, the Э knob and the О knob. After this, the cosmonauts toggled the activation switch on the left-side Control panel. This last action connected the flight sequencer system's impulses to the instrument's solenoid actuator. These impulses were then converted into a slow, regular mechanical advance which cascaded through the mechanical components, effecting the computations needed to move the globe and other indicators.

Meanwhile, the instrument's variable resistor and cam-activated electric blade contacts modulated electrical signals from other electrical instruments through the spacecraft and its control systems, feeding them with an analog representation of the spacecraft's displacement relative to Earth coordinates. From a systems design perspective, it is remarkable, even in the early 1960s, that a mechanical system generated crucial, primary data to electrical and electronic control and telemetry systems through the spacecraft.

During orbital operations, the crew periodically resynchronized the instrument's readings with ground-generated data during communication passes. On a Soyuz mission, the spacecraft has the added capability to do orbital maneuvers, and the orbital parameters on the IMP instrument had to be changed accordingly for each maneuver.

When the critical operation of deorbit retrorockets burn was approaching in preparation for atmospheric entry, the crew monitored the automatic orientation of the spacecraft (a function of the attitude control system), then toggled the proper switch on the Control panel to "fast-forward" the IMP instrument in order to display the projected point of landing. The crew then stood ready to effect a manual deorbit burn if the automatic systems failed to work.

== Mechanical computer ==
The IMP was a genuine mechanical computer. From the sole solenoid actuator's incremental motion, the horological mechanism derived irregular oscillating functions which in turn rotated the globe and varied its axis, and also moved its two cylindrical indicators for longitude and latitude. Some uncommon, intricate horological devices found in the IMP include cardioid-shaped cam discs, a cone-shaped cam cylinder with a cardioid cross-section and "mechanical rectifiers" which transformed an alternating motion into an analogous, but unidirectional motion (see illustrations).

The only other electric actuator used in the IMP instrument was the motor used to fast-forward the mechanism from the actual point-to-nadir to the expected landing point, some 120 degrees further east.

== Production, conservation and public display ==
A few dozen specimens at most of the Voskhod Globus instrument Versions 3 and 4 were built, including the two flown during the Voskhod 1 and Voskhod 2 missions, test articles and units flown in unmanned missions. Many of them are exhibited in various Russian aerospace museums (sometimes mislabelled as Vostok IMP instruments), while a few are known to be in individuals' space-related artifact collections. Furthermore, an unknown number of units may still belong to former Soviet space workers' and officials' estates. The Smithsonian Institution's National Air and Space Museum in Washington DC (US) exhibits several Soyuz spacecraft whose Globus are still in place, but their instrument panels are not visible to visitors. The museum also displays a TKS spacecraft with a Soyuz-version of the IMP instrument, whose panels and the Globus can be glimpsed through the porthole.

Space-related artifacts are available for purchase on online auction sites, on specialized auctions and through specialized dealers. However, items such as Globus instruments rarely come on the market.

One specimen of a Voskhod Globus IMP instrument have been the property of Canadian space-related artifact collector François Guay. It is now (2020) owned by one of the premier space hardware collectors in the world, based in the United States. It has been exhibited in temporary exhibitions, notably the National Watch and Clock Museum in Columbia, Pennsylvania, US, and at the Space Science Center of the Cosmodome in Laval, Quebec, Canada.

== Gallery ==
=== Elements of mechanical computing ===
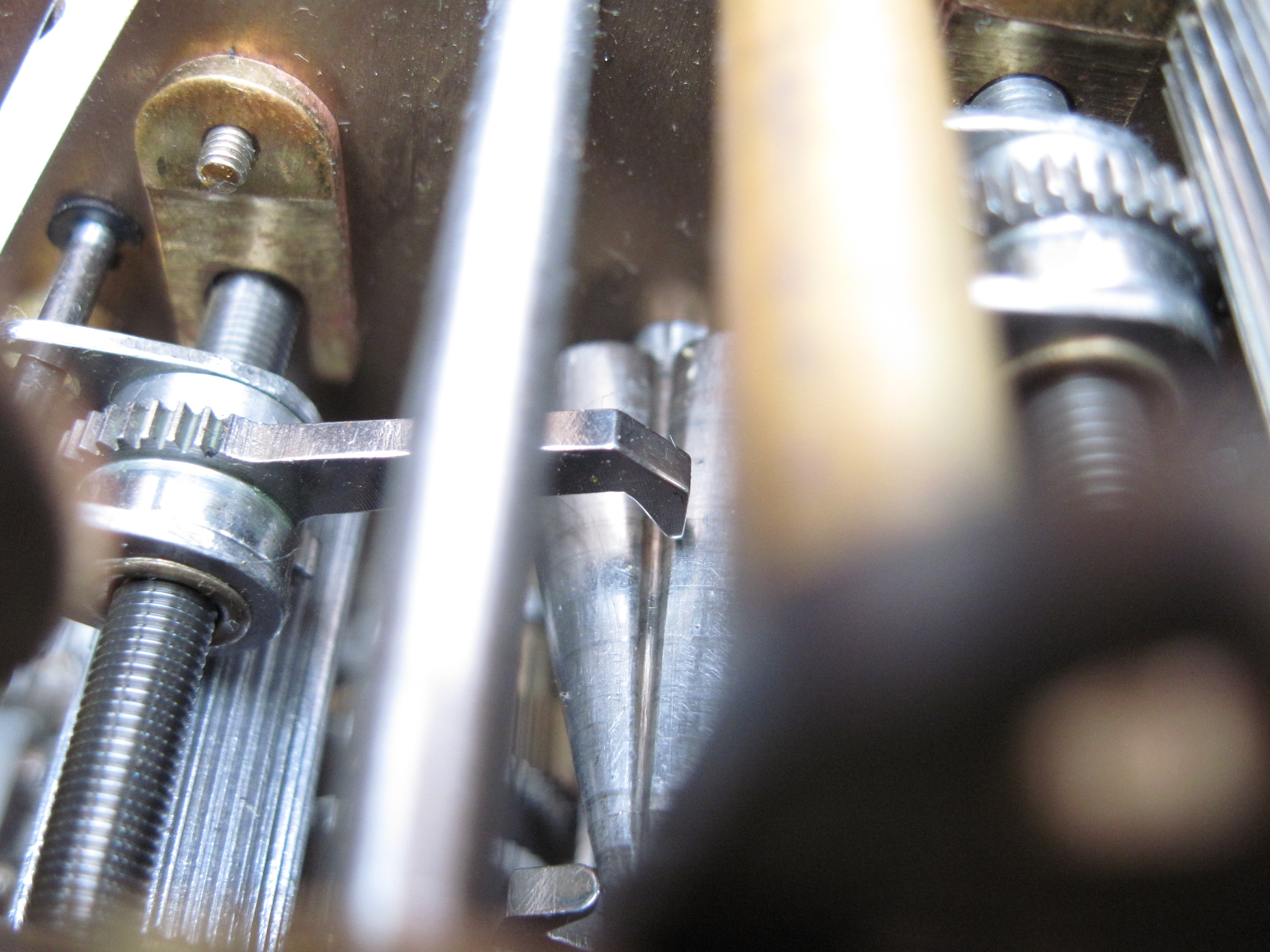
A combination of a conical cam, a rocker arm and a rocket arm worm screw conveyor transforms a rotary motion into an oscillation function, whose amplitude is varied by a manual setting

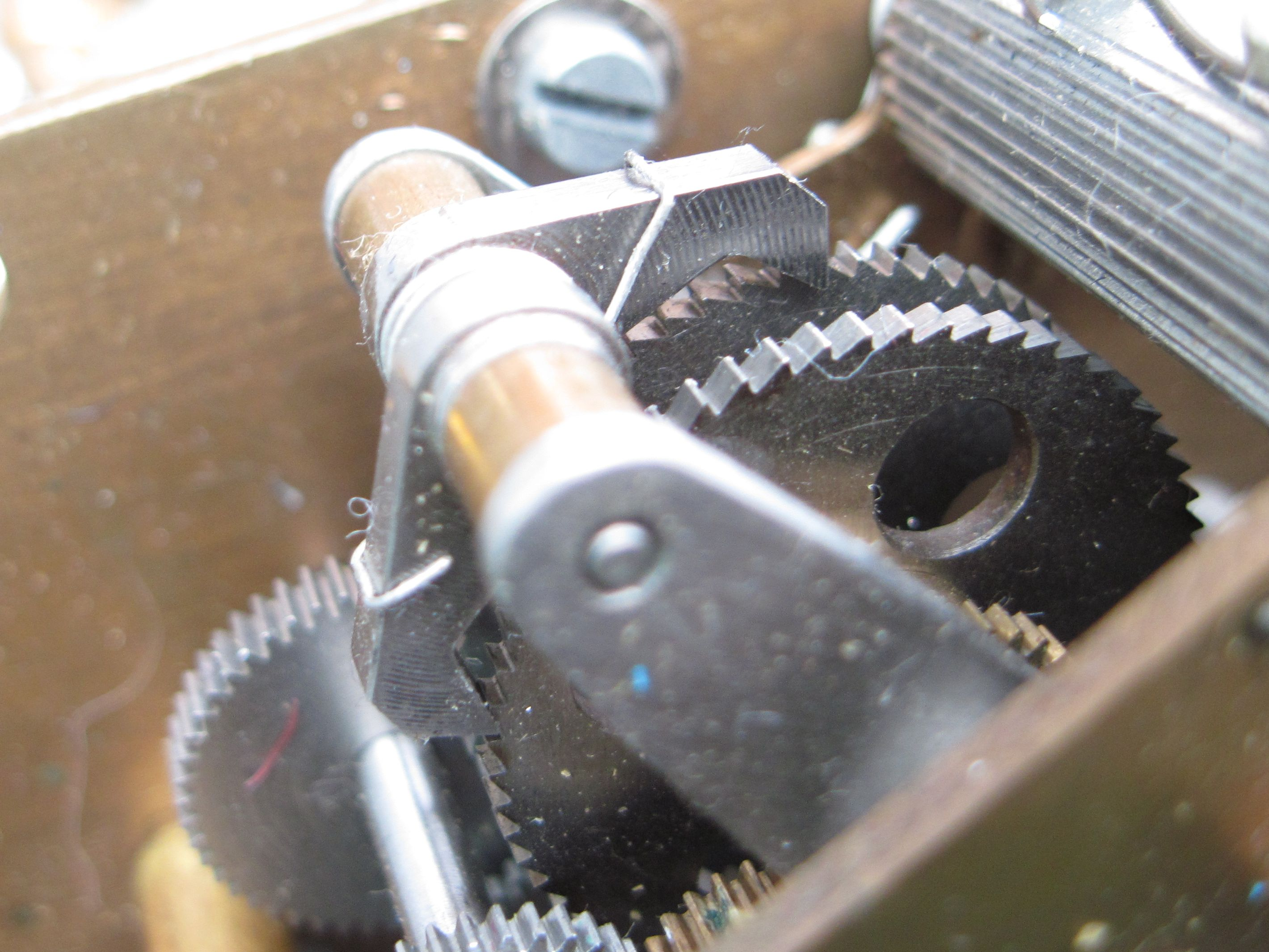
A combination which redresses an alternating motion into an analogous, unidirectional motion

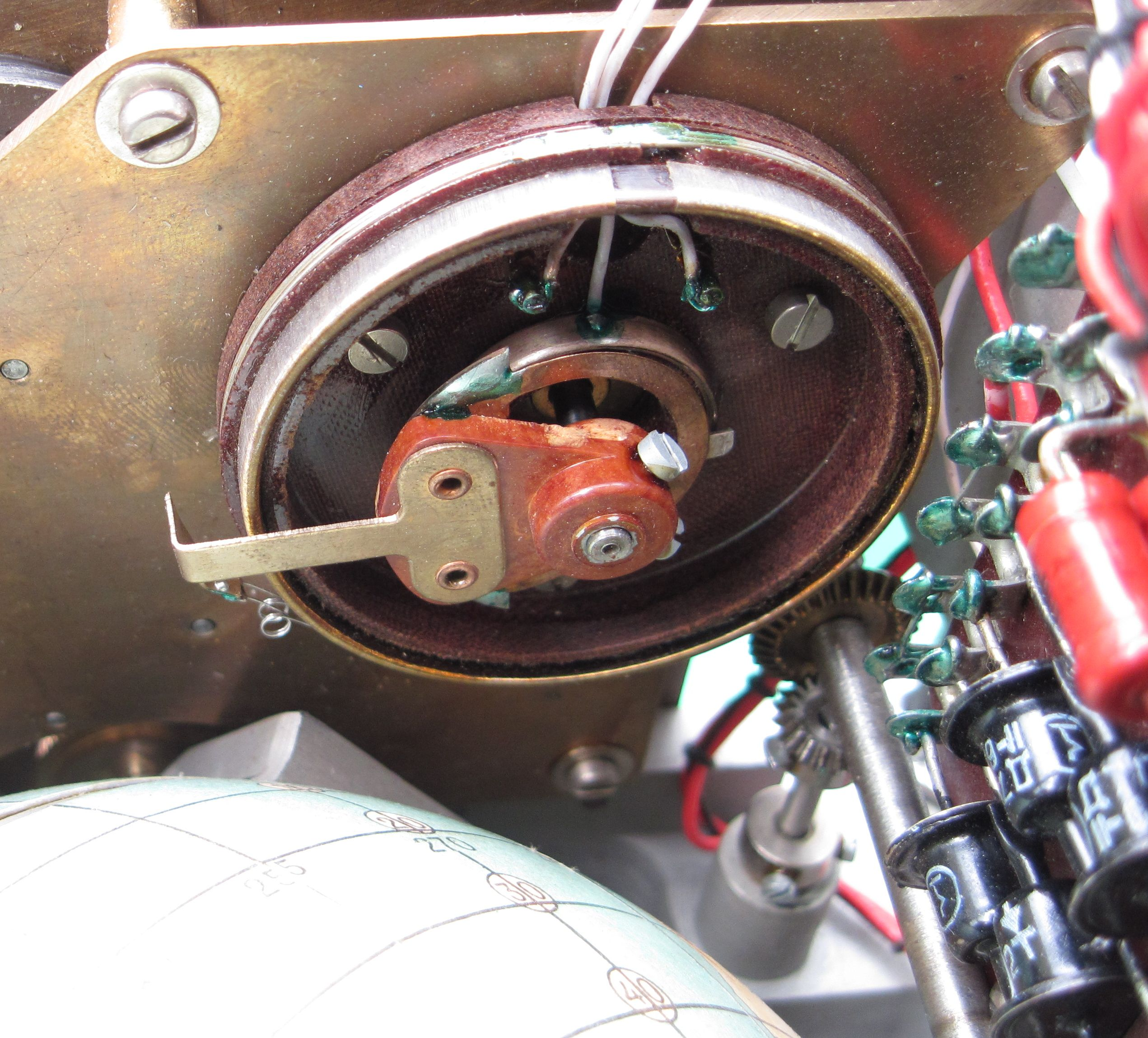
A variable resistor rotating once every orbit returns the actual angular position within the orbit to other instruments

== See also ==
- Terrestrial globe
- Voskhod 1
- Voskhod 2
- Voskhod rocket, the launcher used with the Voskhod spacecraft
- Voskhod programme, including cancelled crewed missions
- Voskhod spacecraft, for which the Globus IMP 3 was specifically built
- Vostok spacecraft, instrumented with anterior versions of the IMP
