= Kosmos 57 =

Uncrewed test flight of the Voskhod spacecraft

- Mission type: Orbital test flight
- Operator: OKB-1
- COSPAR ID: 1965-012A
- SATCAT no.: 1093
- Mission duration: ≈ 3.5 hours

Spacecraft properties
- Spacecraft: Voskhod-3KD No.1
- Manufacturer: OKB-1
- Launch mass: 5682 kg

Start of mission
- Launch date: 22 February 1965, 07:41:00 GMT
- Rocket: Voskhod 11A57
- Launch site: Baikonur 31/6
- Contractor: OKB-1

End of mission
- Disposal: Self-destructed
- Destroyed: 22 February 1965
- Decay date: 31 March — 6 April 1965

Orbital parameters
- Reference system: Geocentric
- Regime: Low Earth
- Perigee altitude: 165 km
- Apogee altitude: 427 km
- Inclination: 64.8°
- Period: 91.1 minutes
- Epoch: 22 February 1965

Kosmos 57 (Russian: Космос 57 meaning Cosmos 57) was an uncrewed Soviet spacecraft launched on 22 February 1965. The craft was essentially an uncrewed version of Voskhod 2. Its primary mission was to test the Volga airlock. The test was successful, but the craft was lost shortly after. The spaceflight is designated under the Kosmos system, placing it with many other Soviet scientific and military satellites.

== Mission ==
The uncrewed craft was launched three weeks before Voskhod 2. The primary objective of Voskhod 2 was to conduct a spacewalk, which relied on the inflatable Volga airlock. Kosmos 57 was to test the performance of the airlock. The airlock opened and closed successfully and the craft was re-pressurized without flaw.

== Destruction ==
The uncrewed spacecraft was destroyed on its third orbit around Earth. Two ground stations, one in Klyuchi and the other in Yelizovo, sent simultaneous commands, instead of sequentially as planned, instructing the craft to depressurize its airlock. The craft interpreted this as an order to begin the descent and a propulsion error put the craft into a tumble. Approximately twenty-nine minutes later, the craft's automatic self-destruct function activated. The craft was completely destroyed to prevent sensitive information from literally falling into enemy hands. Over 100 pieces of the spacecraft were tracked, falling into the ocean between 31 March and 6 April 1965. No other test or backup spacecraft was built with an EVA port. The decision was made to go ahead with Voskhod 2 anyway, due to a one-year lead time to construct a replacement. Planned follow-on Voskhod missions were cancelled, including the Soviet Air Force version, long-duration one-man flight.

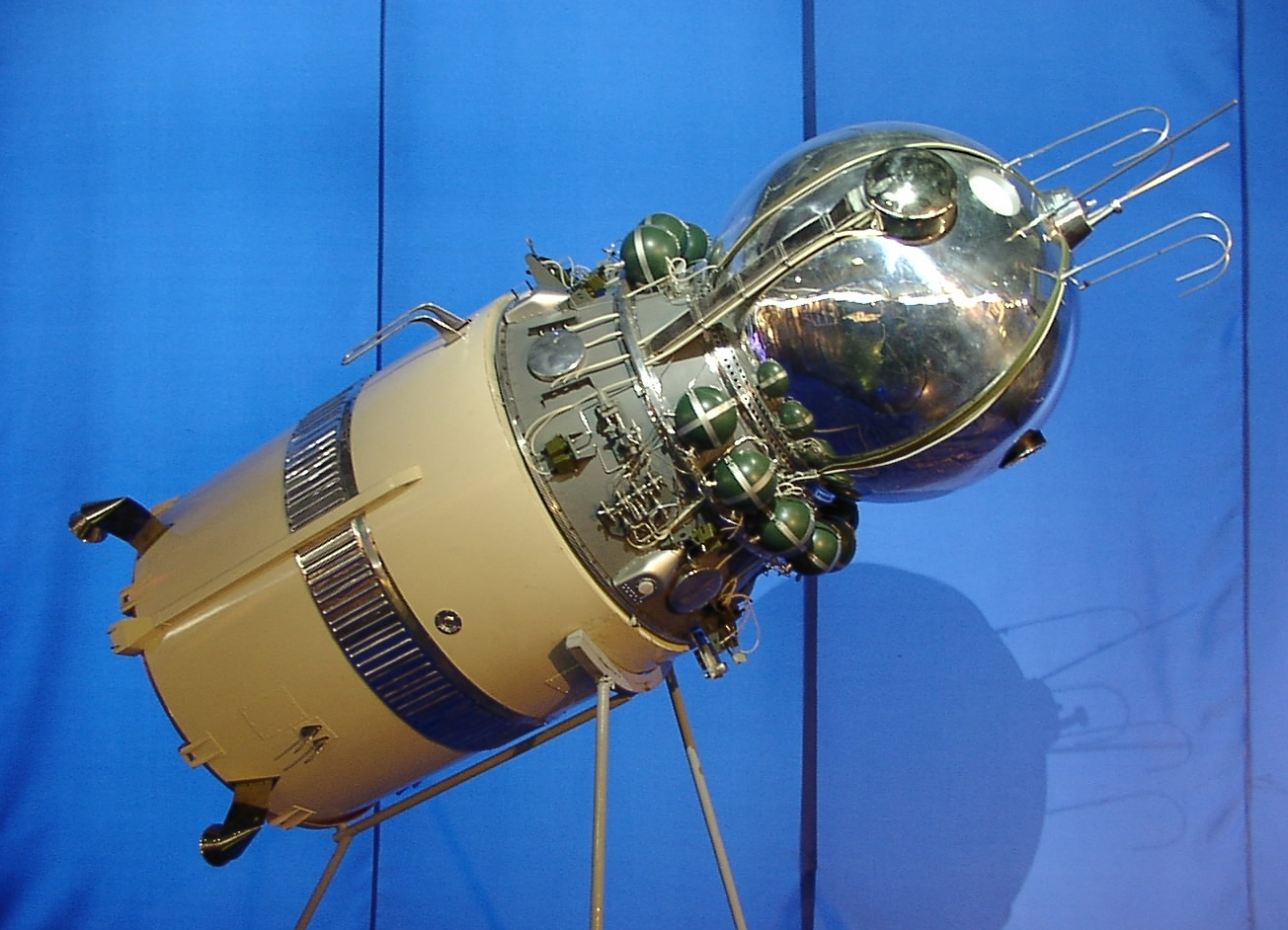
Vostok spacecraft

Voskhod 1 and Voskhod 2 spacecraft

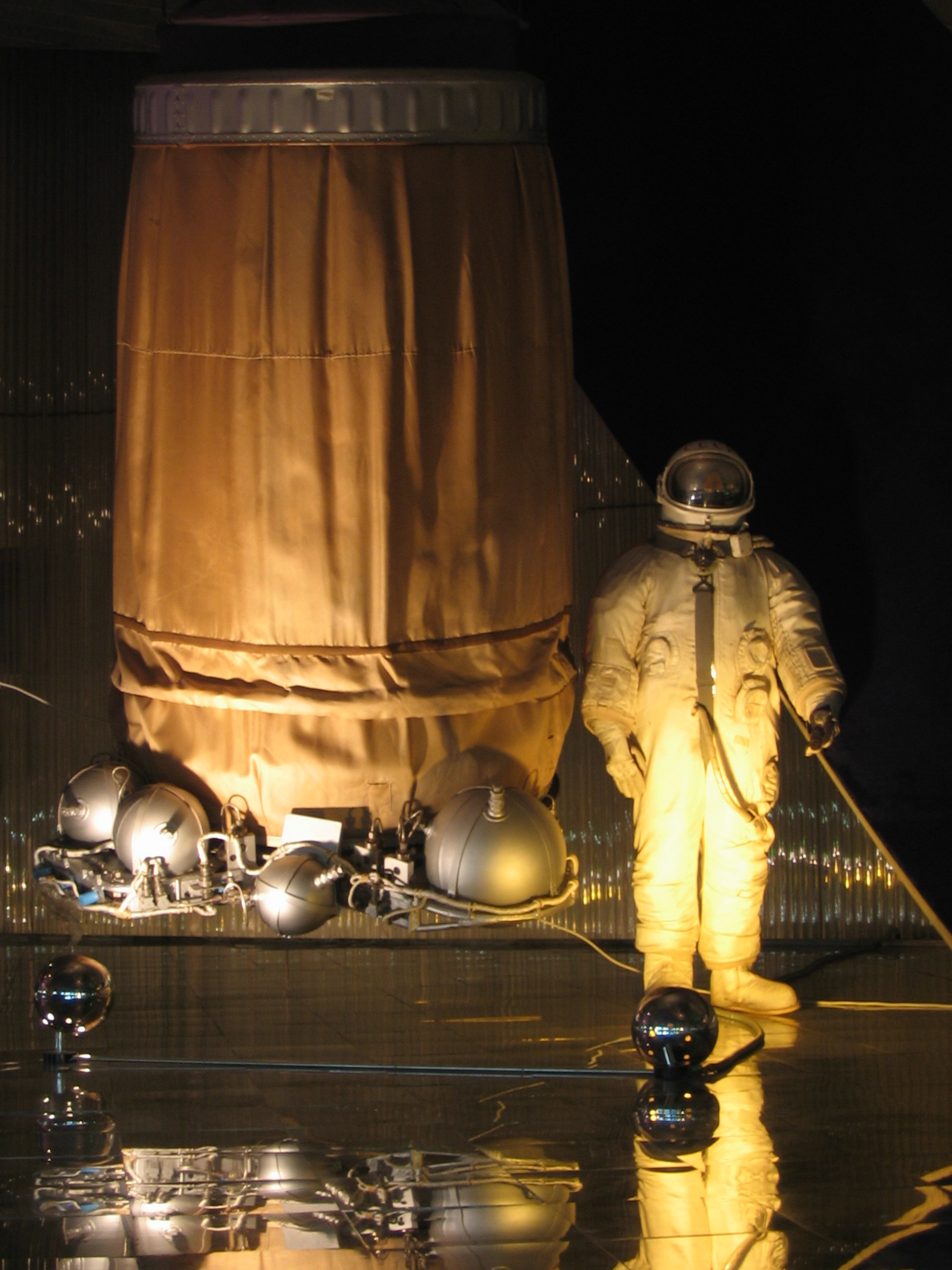
Volga airlock and Berkut spacesuit like those used for the spacewalk of Alexey Leonov on the Voskhod 2 mission, Memorial Museum of Cosmonautics, Moscow.

== See also ==
- List of Kosmos satellites
- Overview at Encyclopaedia britannica
- Spacecraft launches in 1965, Overview
