= Dmitry Zaikin =

Dmitry Zaikin Дмитрий Заикин
- Native name: Дмитрий Алексеевич Заикин
- Born: 29 April 1932; Yekaterinovka village, Rostov Oblast, RSFSR, USSR
- Died: 20 October 2013 (aged 81) Moscow oblast, Russian Federation
- Allegiance: Soviet Union
- Branch: Soviet Air Force
- Rank: Colonel

Dmitry Alekseevich Zaikin (Russian: Дмитрий Алексеевич Заикин; 29 April 1932 – 20 October 2013) was a Soviet cosmonaut trainer.

Zaikin was born in Yekaterinovka, Rostov Oblast. He graduated from Military Fighter Pilot School, Armavir (Krasnodar Krai) and Frunze (now Bishkek), in 1955. He was selected for the cosmonaut training in 1960, as one of a group of the twenty Air Force pilots who would train as the first cosmonauts.

Zayikin was assigned as backup commander for Voskhod 2. He then went on to graduate from the Zhukovsky Military Engineering Academy of Monino in 1968. He left the space service on 25 October 1969 for medical reasons while training for Soyuz missions. He then became an instructor and lead engineer at the Yuri Gagarin Cosmonauts Training Center.

He left the space program in 1982, and retired from active military duty in 1987.

He was married with two children.

Zaikin died of natural causes on 20 October 2013, as reported by Star City, the Yuri Gagarin Training Centre.
