= Voskhod (spacecraft) =

First multi crew and EVA-capable spacecraft

- Voskhod 1 and 2 spacecraft
- Manufacturer: OKB-1
- Designer: Sergei Korolev
- Country of origin: Soviet Union
- Operator: OKB-1 (Now RKK Energia)
- Applications: Human spaceflight

Specifications
- Spacecraft type: Crewed
- Launch mass: 5686kg
- Crew capacity: 3 and 2
- Regime: Low Earth

Dimensions
- Length: 5 m

Production
- Status: Retired
- Built: 5+
- Launched: 5
- Retired: 5
- Maiden launch: 6 October 1964
- Last launch: 18 March 1965

Related spacecraft
- Derived from: Vostok
- Derivatives: Bion

The Voskhod (Russian: Восход, lit. 'Sunrise') was a spacecraft built by the Soviet Union's space program for human spaceflight as part of the Voskhod programme. It was a development of and a follow-on to the Vostok spacecraft. Voskhod 1 was used for a three-man flight whereas Voskhod 2 had a crew of two. They consisted of a spherical descent module (diameter 2.3 metres (7.5 ft)), which housed the cosmonauts, and instruments, and a conical equipment module (mass 2.27 tonnes or 5,000 pounds, 2.25 m (7.4 ft) long, 2.43 m (8.0 ft) wide), which contained propellant and the engine system. Voskhod was superseded by the Soyuz spacecraft in 1967.

== Design ==
The Voskhod spacecraft was, essentially, a Vostok spacecraft that had a backup solid fuel retrorocket added to the top of the descent module. The ejection seat was removed for more space and two or three crew couches were added to the interior at a 90° angle to that of the Vostok crew position. There was no provision for crew escape in the event of a launch or landing emergency.

Lack of space meant that the three crew members of Voskhod 1 did not wear space suits. Both crew members wore spacesuits on the Voskhod 2 mission, as it involved an EVA and used an inflatable airlock. This allowed cosmonaut Alexei Leonov to exit and re-enter the craft. It was needed because the vehicle's electrical and environmental systems were air-cooled, and complete capsule depressurization would lead to overheating. The airlock weighed 250 kg (550 lb), was 70 cm (28 in) in diameter, 77 cm (30 in) high when collapsed for launch. When extended in orbit, it was 2.5 m (8.2 ft) long, had an internal diameter of 1 m (3 ft 3 in) and an external diameter of 1.2 m (3.9 ft). The second crew member wore a spacesuit as a precaution against accidental descent module depressurization. The airlock was jettisoned after use.

The lack of ejection seats meant that the Voskhod crew would return to Earth inside their spacecraft, unlike the Vostok cosmonauts who ejected and parachuted down separately. Because of this, a new landing system was developed, which added a small solid-fuel rocket to the parachute lines. It fired as the descent module neared touchdown, providing a softer landing.

A backup solid-fueled retrorocket was added to the top of the descent module in the event that the main retrorocket failed. This had not been necessary on Vostok as the orbit was low enough that the spacecraft's orbit would decay in ten days if the retrorocket failed, there being enough onboard consumables to sustain the cosmonaut that long. In any case, the Blok E equipped R-7 booster lacked sufficient lift capacity for a backup retrorocket. Since Voskhod was well below the maximum lift capacity of the larger Blok I equipped R-7, it would be put into a quite high orbit and not decay in ten days.

Voskhod utilized the 11A57 booster, essentially the Molniya 8K78L with the Blok L stage removed to create a medium-lift LEO launcher, and later the launch vehicle for the Soyuz program.

The spacecraft lacked any launch escape system, meaning that the crew would not survive a booster failure that occurred in the first 2.5 minutes of launch (after payload shroud jettison, the descent module could be detached). Although work had begun on an LES in 1962, it was not ready yet and so the engineers and cosmonauts had to gamble that the booster functioned properly during ascent, as by 1964, the R-7's success rate was improving but still not perfect.

== Vostok 3KV (1964) ==
Also known as Voskhod. Adaptation of the Vostok spacecraft for three cosmonauts. This version flew twice, on 6 October 1964 uncrewed (as Kosmos 47) and on 12 October 1964 crewed as Voskhod 1.

=== Basic data ===
- Crew size: 3 (without spacesuits)
- Endurance: 14.0 days
- Overall length: 5.0 m
- Maximum diameter: 2.4 m
- Total mass: 5682 kg
- Propellant mass: 362 kg
- RCS total impulse: not available
- Primary engine thrust: 15.83 kN
- Main engine propellants: nitrous oxide/amine
- Total spacecraft delta V: 215 m/s
- Power: batteries, 24.0 kW total

=== Reentry module ===
- Crew size: 3
- Diameter: 2.3 m (sphere)
- Total mass: 2900 kg
- Attitude control: none
- Environment: oxygen + nitrogen at 1 atm
- Controls: as Vostok 3KA
- Navigation indicator: Globus IMP navigation instrument version 3
- Landing system: Sphere made ballistic reentry, with shield side seeking correct orientation by virtue of the center of gravity being aft of the center of the sphere.
- Parachutes: single with suspended retrorocket package for soft landing. Crew stayed within the capsule.

=== Equipment module ===
- Length: 2.3 m
- Maximum diameter: 2.4 m
- Total mass: 2300 kg
- Propellant mass: 275 kg
- Reaction control system
  - Thrusters: not available
  - Thrusters pressure: 59 PSI (4 bars)
  - Propellant media: Cold gas (nitrogen) at 2200 PSI (150 bar)
  - Propellants storage: 20 kg stored in 12 pressure bottles (5 + 5 + 2 for first, second and reserve)
  - Specific impulse: not available
  - Total impulse: not available
- Retro-rockets
  - Thrust: 15.83 kN
  - Propellant: nitrous oxide/amine
  - Specific impulse: 266 seconds
  - Delta V: 155 m/s
- Power: batteries, 24.0 kW total, 0.20 kW average

=== Landing retrorocket module (commonly known as landing rocket pack) ===
- Length: 0.6 m
- Maximum diameter: 0.3 m
- Total mass: 143 kg
- Propellant mass: 87 kg
- Thrust: 117.7 kN
- Propellant: solid
- Specific impulse: 224 seconds
- Delta V: 60 m/s

== Voskhod 3KD (1965) ==
This version flew twice, on 22 February 1965 uncrewed (as Kosmos 57) and on 18 March 1965 crewed as the Voskhod 2 spacecraft.

=== Reentry Module ===
Reentry Module: Voskhod SA. Also known as: Spuskaemiy apparat - Sharik (sphere).

- Crew Size: 2
- Length: 2.3 m
- Diameter: 2.3 m
- Mass: 2900 kg
- Heat Shield Mass: 837 kg
- Recovery equipment: 151 kg
- Parachute deploys at 2.5 km altitude
- Crew lands in spacecraft. Touchdown rocket softens landing.
- Ballistic reentry acceleration: 8 g (78 m/s²)

=== Equipment Module ===
Equipment Module: Voskhod PA. Also known as: Priborniy otsek.

- Length: 2.25 m
- Diameter: 2.43 m
- Mass: 2300 kg
- Equipment in pressurized compartment
- RCS Propellants: Cold gas (nitrogen)
- RCS Propellants: 20 kg
- Main Engine (TDU): 397 kg
- Main Engine Thrust: 15.83 kN
- Main Engine Propellants: Nitrous oxide/amine
- Main Engine Propellant Mass: 275 kg
- Main Engine Isp: 266 s (2.61 kN·s/kg)
- Main Engine Burn Time: 60 seconds (typical retro burn = 42 seconds)
- Spacecraft delta V: 155 m/s
- Electrical System: Batteries
- Electric System: 0.20 average kW
- Electric System: 24.0 kW-h

=== Auxiliary Retrorocket Module ===
Auxiliary Retrorocket Module: Voskhod KDU. Also known as: Engine unit

- Length: 0.60 m
- Diameter: 0.25 m
- Mass: 143 kg
- Engine Thrust: 118 kN
- Engine Propellants: Solid
- Propellant Mass: 87 kg
- Engine Isp: 224 seconds (2.20 kN·s/kg)
- Spacecraft delta V: 60 m/s

== General data ==
- Total Mass: 5682 kg
- Total Length: 5.0 m
- Endurance: Supplies for 14 days in orbit
- Launch Vehicle: Voskhod 11A57
- Typical orbit: 163 km x 591 km, 64.8° inclination

== See also ==
- Voskhod 2
- Voskhod rocket
- Voskhod programme
- Spacecraft
- Voskhod Spacecraft Globus IMP navigation instrument

== Bibliography ==
- Siddiqi, Asif A. (2000). Challenge To Apollo: The Soviet Union and the Space Race, 1945–1974 (PDF). US: NASA. ISBN 1780393016.
