= Voskhod 1 =

First multi-crew spaceflight

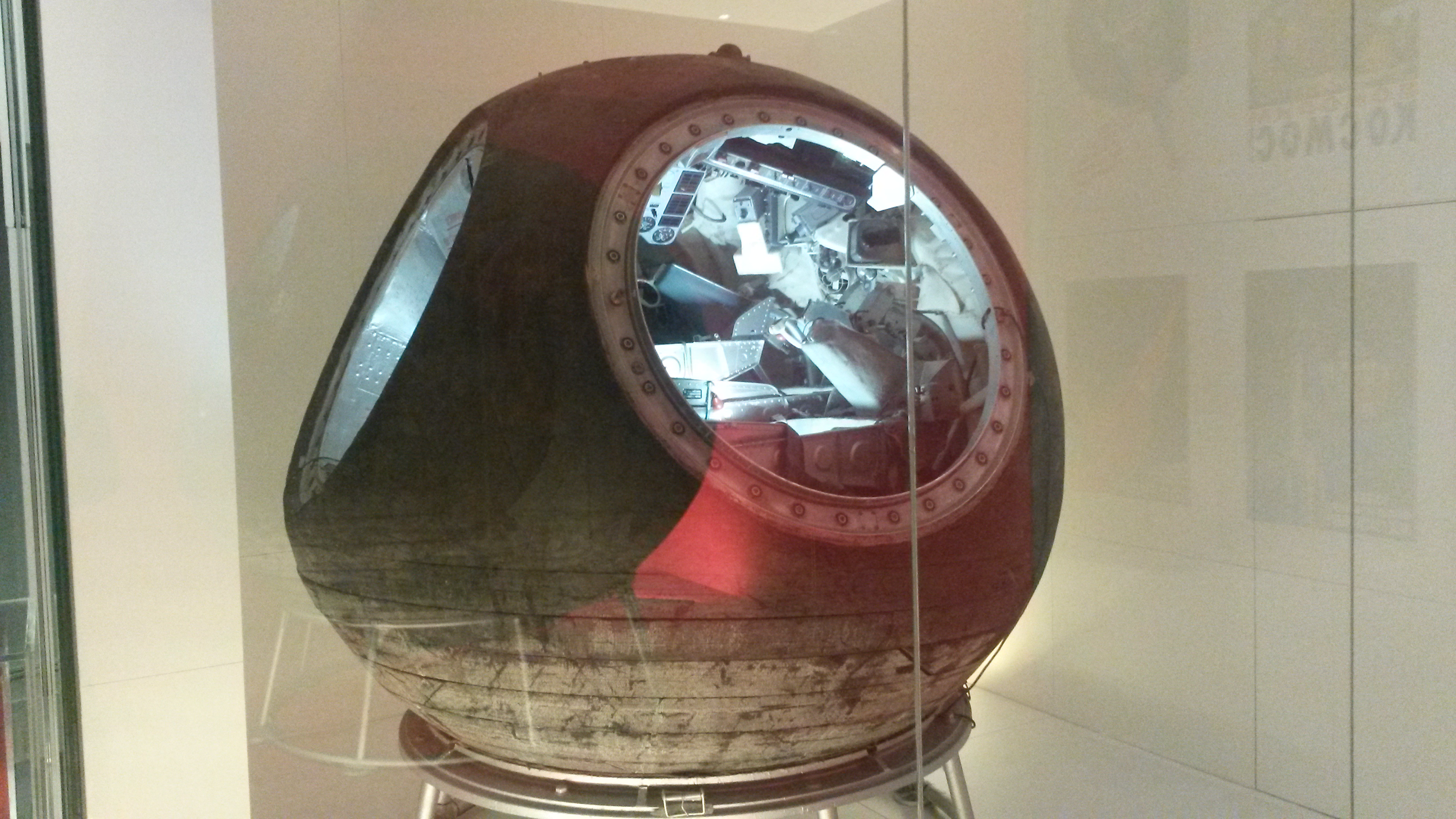
- Voskhod 1 capsule in the Science Museum, London
- Operator: Soviet space program
- COSPAR ID: 1964-065A
- SATCAT no.: 904
- Mission duration: 1 day, 17 minutes, 3 seconds
- Orbits completed: 16

Spacecraft properties
- Spacecraft: Voskhod-3KV No.3
- Manufacturer: Experimental Design Bureau OKB-1
- Launch mass: 5,320 kilograms (11,730 lb)
- Landing mass: G

Crew
- Crew size: 3
- Members: Vladimir Komarov; Konstantin Feoktistov; Boris Yegorov
- Callsign: Рубин (Rubin - "Ruby")

Start of mission
- Launch date: 12 October 1964, 07:30:01 UTC
- Rocket: Voskhod 11A57
- Launch site: Baikonur 1/5

End of mission
- Landing date: 13 October 1964, 07:47:04 UTC
- Landing site: 52°2′N 68°8′E

Orbital parameters
- Reference system: Geocentric
- Regime: Low Earth
- Perigee altitude: 178 kilometres (111 mi)
- Apogee altitude: 336 kilometres (209 mi)
- Inclination: 64.7 degrees
- Period: 89.6 minutes

Voskhod 1 (Russian: Восход-1, lit. 'Sunrise-1') was the seventh crewed Soviet space flight. Flown by cosmonauts Vladimir Komarov, Konstantin Feoktistov, and Boris Yegorov, it launched 12 October 1964, and returned on the 13th. Voskhod 1 was the first human spaceflight to carry more than one crewman into orbit, the first flight without the use of spacesuits, and the first to carry either an engineer or a physician into outer space. It also set a crewed spacecraft altitude record of 336 km (209 mi).

The three spacesuits for the Voskhod 1 cosmonauts were omitted; there was neither the room nor the payload capacity for the Voskhod to carry them. The original Voskhod had been designed to carry two cosmonauts, but Soviet politicians pushed the Soviet space program into squeezing three cosmonauts into Voskhod 1. The only other space flight in the short Voskhod program, Voskhod 2, carried two suited cosmonauts – of necessity, because it was the flight on which Alexei Leonov made the world's first walk in space.

As part of its payload Voskhod 1 carried a ribbon off a Communard banner from the Paris Commune of 1871 into orbit.

== Cosmonauts ==
Position	Cosmonaut
Command Pilot	Vladimir Komarov; First spaceflight
Engineer	Konstantin Feoktistov; Only spaceflight
Medical Doctor	Boris Yegorov; Only spaceflight

=== Back-up crew ===
Position	Cosmonaut
Command Pilot	Boris Volynov
Engineer	Georgi Katys
Medical Doctor	Aleksey Sorokin

=== Reserve Cosmonaut ===
Position	Cosmonaut
Medical Doctor	Vasili Lazarev

== Mission parameters ==
- Mass: 5,320 kg (11,730 lb)
- Perigee: 178 km (111 mi)
- Apogee: 336 km (209 mi)
- Inclination: 64.7°
- Period: 89.6 min

== Background ==
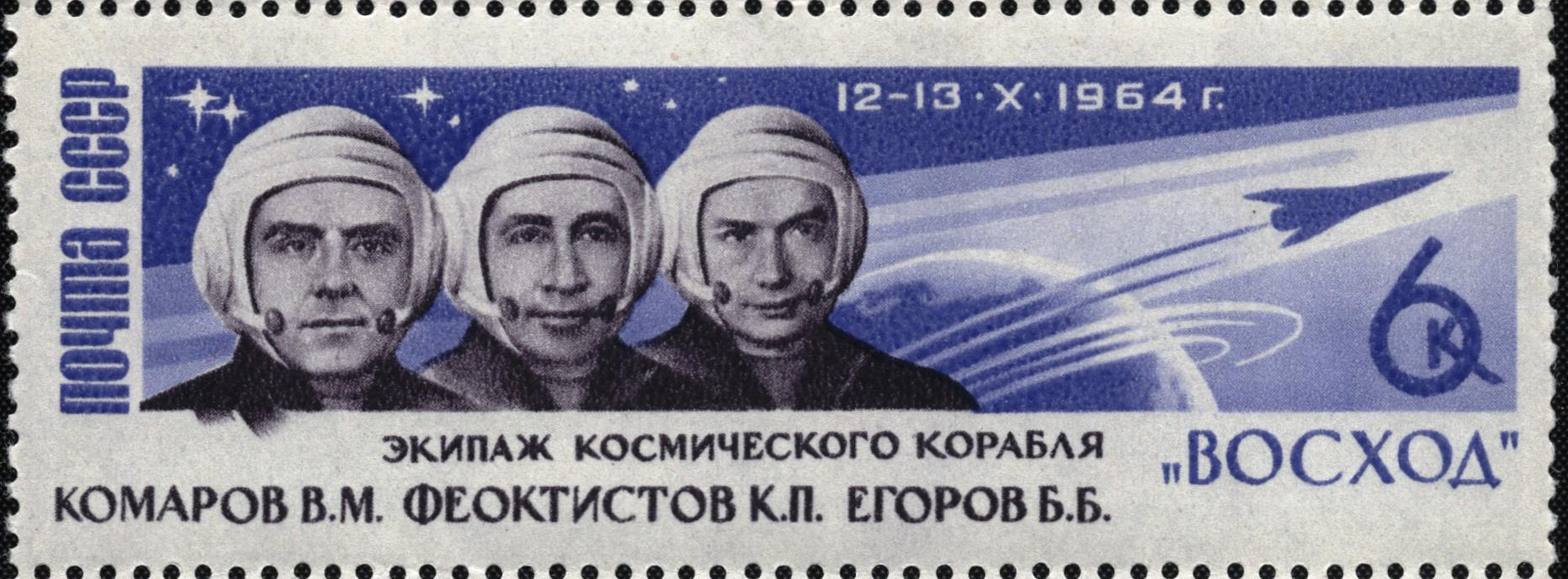
Postal stamp commemorating Voskhod 1 mission

The original prime crew of cosmonauts for Voskhod 1, composed of Boris Volynov, Georgi Katys, and Boris Yegorov, was rejected just three days before the scheduled launch date for the space capsule. Katys was reportedly removed after the KGB discovered that his father had been shot during the Great Purge in 1937 and Volynov apparently was the victim of discrimination due to his part-Jewish background, although he would later fly on Soyuz 5 and Soyuz 21.

Politics played a role in the crew's selection. Various factions each supported their own representatives for the flight. Sergei Korolev wanted his engineers to become cosmonauts, believing that spacecraft designers should fly in their own vehicles. The Soviet Air Force agreed to a crew composed of a military pilot, an engineer or scientist, and a doctor, but advocated for an all-military crew. Konstantin Feoktistov, who had been a design engineer for the Vostok, Voskhod, and Soyuz programs, was selected for this flight, becoming the only Soviet outer space designer to make a spaceflight. Yegorov, a medical doctor, used his political influence to get selected for the crew through his father's Politburo connections. The Soviet space program viewed its crews as passengers more than pilots; the new cosmonauts received only three to four months of training, perhaps the briefest in space history other than that received by the American politicians Jake Garn and Bill Nelson for Space Shuttle flights in the 1980s.

== Mission highlights ==
Voskhod 1 and 2 space capsules

The Voskhod spacecraft were basically Vostok spacecraft with a backup solid-fuel retrorocket added onto the top of the descent module. The ejection seat was removed and three crew couches were added to the interior at a 90-degree angle to that of the Vostok cosmonaut's position. Because of the cramped conditions, the cosmonauts also had to go on a diet to fit in their couches. A solid-fuel braking rocket was also added to the space capsule's parachute lines to provide for a softer landing at touchdown. This was necessary because, unlike the Vostok space capsule, no ejection seats were fitted in the Voskhod; the cosmonauts had to land inside the descent module. Aside from that, the Vostok booster had lacked sufficient payload capacity to support the extra weight of a retrorocket package, but the larger upper stage used on the 11A57 launch vehicle meant that this was no longer an issue. As there was no launch escape system, the mission could not be aborted until three minutes after liftoff when the payload shroud was jettisoned and so a low-altitude booster accident would have meant the loss of the crew.

Liftoff took place at 7:30 on the morning of 12 October. Much of the mission of Voskhod 1 was devoted to biomedical research, and to the study of how a multidisciplinary team could work together in space. The mission was short, at only slightly over 24 hours. The Soviet premier Nikita Khrushchev was removed from power during the spaceflight, and it has been speculated that this led to the mission being cut short. The cramped conditions of the Voskhod space capsule has also been suggested as a factor ruling out a longer-duration spaceflight.

During the flight, Khrushchev spoke with the cosmonauts via radio phone from his dacha in the Crimea. Shortly after this conversation, he was summoned back to Moscow where he learned that he was being expelled from office and the Communist Party. When the crew returned to Earth the next day, they were greeted by Leonid Brezhnev and Alexei Kosygin in their first public appearance as leaders of the Soviet Union.

Despite the propaganda boasting around Voskhod 1, it was privately referred to by the leadership of the Soviet space program as "a circus" due to the messy process of crew selection, the cosmonauts needing to diet to fit inside their spacecraft, Khrushchev's expulsion during the flight, and also the extremely dangerous circumstances of it (the crew having neither pressure suits nor any way to escape from a malfunctioning launch vehicle).

Happening as it did before the beginning of the Project Gemini two-man flights, Voskhod 1 had a significant, but temporary, international impact. The NASA Administrator, James E. Webb, called the flight of Voskhod 1 a "significant space accomplishment" adding that it was "a clear indication that the Russians are continuing a large space program for the achievement of national power and prestige."

== Development ==
The Voskhod 1 mission was the first three-man mission attempted by the USSR. The development for this mission was formally approved on 13 April 1964. This mission used a modified Vostok spacecraft that had been designed for previous manned missions. The modified Vostok spacecraft was renamed Voskhod 1 for the new three-man missions. The Voskhod 1 required many modifications since three cosmonauts had to fit in the capsule that had previously been designed for only one person. Some modifications also had to be made to the 11A57 launch vehicle which was used to launch the Voskhod 1. The first major modification was replacing the one ejection seat with three couches since there were now three cosmonauts. These couches included a suspension system to absorb the shock from launch and landing. Because of space and weight requirements these new seats could not be ejection seats. This resulted in a new parachute mechanism being needed to soft land the entire crew capsule. In addition, the limited space did not allow the cosmonauts to wear pressurized spacesuits and they were only able to wear training suits. This was not a major issue since the crew capsule was pressurized. However, it was less safe because the crew would not survive if the capsule depressurized while in space. In previous missions if the primary retrograde rocket failed the capsule would remain in orbit for 10 days before returning to earth. However, with a crew of three they would not be able to survive for that long. Because of this a backup retrograde rocket was added to deorbit the spacecraft in the event that the primary retrograde rocket failed. In addition to these modifications to Voskhod 1, the third stage of the 11A57 launch vehicle was also changed from the Block Ye to the more powerful Block I. This was done because all the modifications added nearly 600 kilograms of weight to Voskhod 1.

During the development of Voskhod 1 a test of the parachute system was conducted on 6 September 1964. The test was conducted by dropping a Voskhod capsule from an altitude of 10,000 meters. During the test, the hatch for the parachute failed to open. This resulted in the Voskhod capsule crashing without the parachute being deployed. After further testing of the parachute system, it was determined that the electrical circuit that controlled the parachute hatch was the cause of the failure. Because of this, the circuit was redesigned with redundancies of the main components. This resulted in a more reliable circuit. A second test of the Voskhod capsule took place on 5 October 1964. This test resulted in a successful soft landing under a parachute. An unmanned test flight was also conducted on 6 October 1964. For this test, a Voskhod spacecraft was renamed the Kosmos-47 and was put into orbit for one day. Kosmos-47 made a successful soft landing under the parachute. This was the last major test before the actual Voskhod 1 crewed mission. This development concluded with the successful Voskhod 1 mission which launched on 12 October 1964.

== See also ==
- Voskhod Spacecraft "Globus" IMP navigation instrument

== Notes ==
Preceded by Yuri Gagarin	Human altitude record 1964-1965	Succeeded by Voskhod 2 crew
