= Kosmos 47 =

Uncrewed test flight of the Voskhod spacecraft

- Mission type: Orbital test flight
- Operator: OKB-1
- COSPAR ID: 1964-062A
- SATCAT no.: 891
- Mission duration: 1 day and 18 minutes

Spacecraft properties
- Spacecraft: Voskhod-3KV No.2
- Manufacturer: OKB-1
- Launch mass: 5320 kg

Start of mission
- Launch date: 6 October 1964, 07:12:00 GMT
- Rocket: Voskhod 11A57
- Launch site: Baikonur 1/5
- Contractor: OKB-1

End of mission
- Landing date: 7 October 1964, 07:30 GMT

Orbital parameters
- Reference system: Geocentric
- Regime: Low Earth
- Perigee altitude: 174 km
- Apogee altitude: 383 km
- Inclination: 64.8°
- Period: 90.0 minutes
- Epoch: 6 October 1964

Kosmos 47 (Russian: Космос 47 meaning Cosmos 47) is the designation of an uncrewed test flight of a prototype Soviet Voskhod spacecraft, the first multiple-occupant spacecraft. Launched on 6 October 1964, the successful flight led to the first crewed mission, Voskhod 1, which occurred just 6 days later on 12 October 1964.

The spacecraft was one of many designated under the Kosmos system, which is applied to a wide variety of spacecraft of different designs and functions including test flights of crewed vehicles.

== Launch ==
The launch took place on 6 October at 07:12 GMT from Gagarin's Start, Site 1/5 at Baikonur Cosmodrome on board a Voskhod rocket s/n R15000-02. Kosmos 47 was operated in a low Earth orbit, it had a perigee of 174 kilometres (108 mi), an apogee of 383 kilometres (238 mi), an inclination of 64.8° and an orbital period of 90.0 minutes. On 7 October 1964, testing of all the spacecraft's systems occurred in the space of 24 hours. The landing took place on 7 October 1964 at around 07:30 GMT. The spacecraft was deorbited with its return capsule descending by parachute for recovery by Soviet Forces.

== Spacecraft ==
The Voskhods spacecraft were adaptations of the single place Vostok spacecraft meant to conduct flights with up to three crew and for spacewalks in advance of the American Gemini program. Work on the 3KV and 3KD versions of the basic Vostok spacecraft began with the decree issued on 13 April 1964. In order to accommodate more than one crew, the seats were mounted perpendicular to the Vostok ejection seat position, so the crew had to crane their necks to read instruments, still mounted in their original orientation. The "Elburs" soft landing system replaced the ejection seat and allowed the crew to stay in the capsule. It consisted of probes that dangled from the parachute lines. Contact with the Earth triggered a solid rocket engine in the parachute which resulted in a zero velocity landing.

== See also ==
- 1964 in spaceflight
