= Voskhod 2 =

Soviet crewed spaceflight; world's first space walk

- Leonov spacewalking outside Voskhod 2
- Mission type: Crewed mission
- Operator: OKB-1
- COSPAR ID: 1965-022A
- SATCAT no.: 1274
- Mission duration: 1 day, 2 hours, 2 minutes, 17 seconds
- Orbits completed: 17

Spacecraft properties
- Spacecraft: Voskhod-3KD No.4
- Manufacturer: Experimental Design Bureau OKB-1
- Launch mass: 5,682 kilograms (12,527 lb)

Crew
- Crew size: 2
- Members: Pavel Belyayev; Alexei Leonov
- Callsign: Алмаз (Almaz – "Diamond")
- EVAs: 1
- EVA duration: 12 minutes, 9 seconds

Start of mission
- Launch date: 18 March 1965, 07:00:00 UTC
- Rocket: Voskhod 11A57
- Launch site: Baikonur 1/5

End of mission
- Landing date: 19 March 1965, 09:02:17 UTC
- Landing site: 59°34′N 55°28′E

Orbital parameters
- Reference system: Geocentric
- Regime: Low Earth
- Perigee altitude: 167 kilometres (104 mi)
- Apogee altitude: 475 kilometres (295 mi)
- Inclination: 64.8°
- Period: 90.9 minutes
- Epoch: 18 March 1965
- Voskhod programme

Voskhod 2 (Russian: Восход-2, lit. 'Sunrise-2') was a Soviet crewed space mission in March 1965. The Vostok-based Voskhod 3KD spacecraft with two crew members on board, Pavel Belyayev and Alexei Leonov, was equipped with an inflatable airlock. It established another milestone in space exploration when Alexei Leonov became the first person to leave the spacecraft in a specialised spacesuit to conduct a 12-minute spacewalk.

== Crew ==
Position	Cosmonaut
Commander	Pavel Belyayev; Only spaceflight
Pilot	Alexei Leonov; First spaceflight

=== Backup crew ===
Position	Cosmonaut
Commander	Dmitri Zaikin
Pilot	Yevgeny Khrunov

=== Reserve crew ===
Position	Cosmonaut
Commander	Viktor Gorbatko
Pilot	Pyotr Kolodin

== Mission parameters ==
- Mass: 5,682 kg (12,527 lb)
- Apogee: 475 km (295 mi)
- Perigee: 167 km (104 mi)
- Inclination: 64.8°
- Period: 90.9 min

=== Space walk ===
- Leonov – EVA – 18 March 1965
  - 08:28:13 GMT: The Voskhod 2 airlock is depressurised by Leonov.
  - 08:32:54 GMT: Leonov opens the Voskhod 2 airlock hatch.
  - 08:34:51 GMT: EVA start – Leonov leaves airlock.
  - 08:47:00 GMT: EVA end – Leonov reenters airlock.
  - 08:48:40 GMT: Hatch on the airlock is closed and secured by Leonov.
  - 08:51:54 GMT: Leonov begins to repressurize the airlock.
  - Duration: 12 minutes 9 seconds

== Mission highlights ==
An interactive 3D model of the Voskhod 2 spacecraft, with inflatable airlock deployed

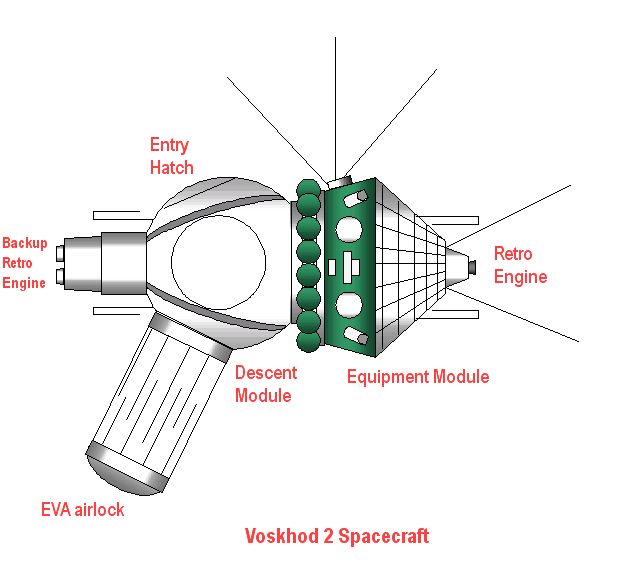
A Voskhod 2 spacecraft, with inflatable airlock deployed

Liftoff took place at 07:00 GMT on 18 March 1965. As with Voskhod 1, a launch abort was not possible during the first few minutes, until the payload shroud jettisoned around the 2 1/2-minute mark.

The Voskhod 3KD spacecraft had an inflatable airlock extended in orbit. Cosmonaut Alexei Leonov donned a Berkut spacesuit and left the spacecraft while the other cosmonaut of the two-man crew, Pavel Belyayev, remained inside. Leonov began his spacewalk 90 minutes into the mission at the end of the first orbit. Cosmonaut Leonov's spacewalk lasted 12 minutes and 9 seconds (08:34:51–08:47:00 GMT), beginning over north-central Africa (northern Sudan/southern Egypt), and ending over eastern Siberia.

The Voskhod 2 spacecraft was a Vostok spacecraft with a backup, solid fuel retrorocket, attached atop the descent module. The ejection seat was removed and two seats were added, (at a 90° angle relative to the Vostok crew seat position). An inflatable exterior airlock was also added to the descent module opposite the entry hatch. After use, the airlock was jettisoned. There was no provision for crew bailout in the event of a launch or landing emergency. A solid fuel braking rocket was also added to the parachute lines to provide for a softer landing at touchdown. This was necessary because, unlike the Vostok, the crew landed with the Voskhod descent module.

Though Leonov was able to complete his spacewalk successfully, both that task and the overall mission were plagued with problems. Leonov's only tasks were to attach a camera to the end of the airlock to record his spacewalk and to photograph the spacecraft. He managed to attach the camera without any problem. However, when he tried to use the still camera on his chest, the suit had ballooned and he was unable to reach down to the shutter switch on his leg. After his 12 minutes and 9 seconds outside the Voskhod, Leonov found that his suit had stiffened, due to ballooning out, to the point where he could not re-enter the airlock. He was forced to bleed off some of his suit's pressure, in order to be able to bend the joints, eventually going below safety limits. Leonov did not report his action on the radio to avoid alarming others, but Soviet state radio and television had earlier stopped their live broadcasts from the spacecraft when the mission experienced difficulties. The two crew members subsequently experienced difficulty in sealing the hatch properly due to thermal distortion caused by Leonov's lengthy troubles returning to the craft, followed by a troublesome re-entry in which malfunction of the automatic landing system forced the use of its manual backup. The spacecraft was so cramped that the two cosmonauts, both wearing spacesuits, could not return to their seats to restore the ship's center of mass for 46 seconds after orienting the ship for reentry and a landing in Perm Krai. The orbital module did not properly disconnect from the landing module, not unlike Vostok 1, causing the spherical return vehicle to spin wildly until the modules disconnected at 100 km.

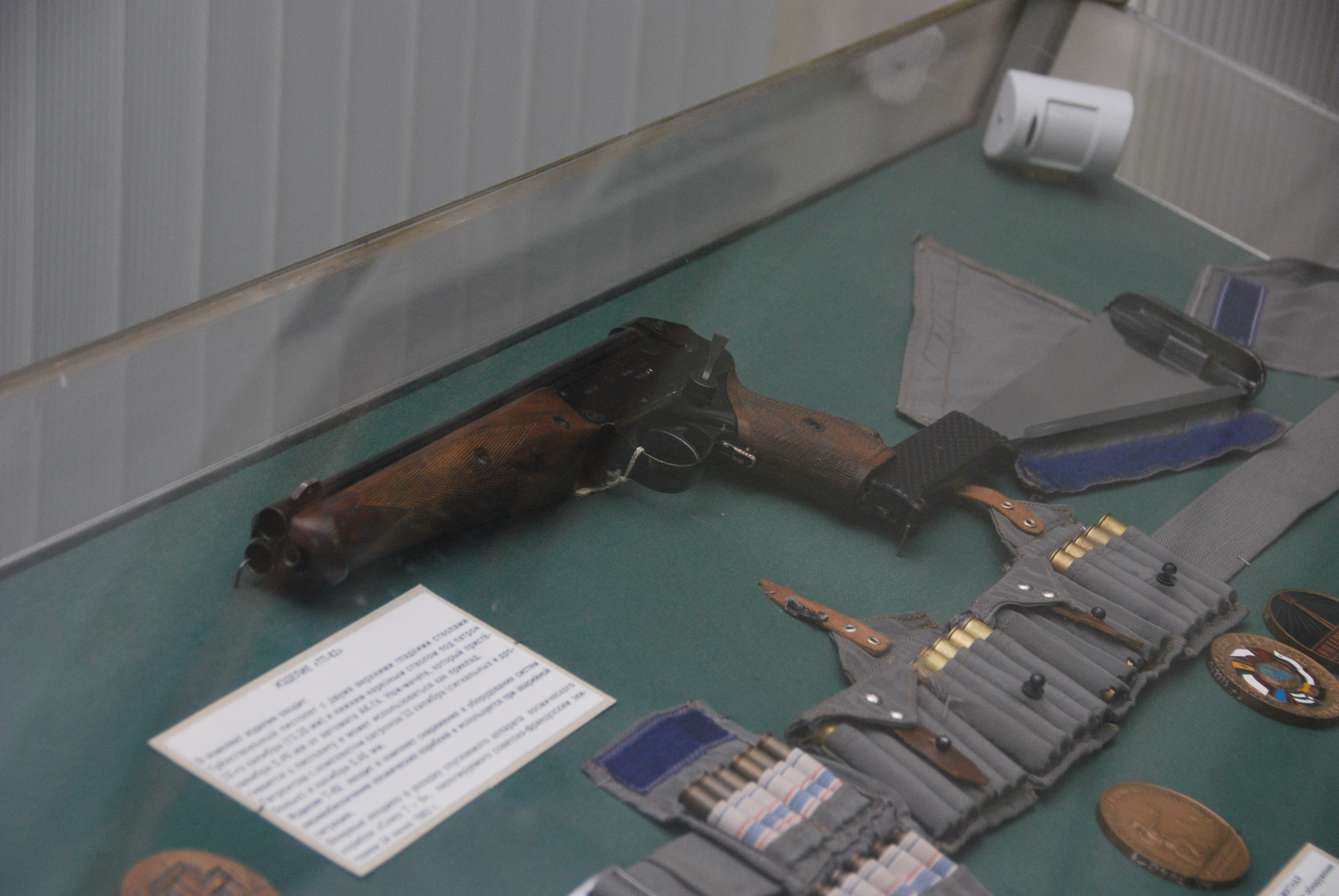
A triple-barreled TP-82 Cosmonaut survival pistol in Saint-Petersburg Artillery museum

The delay of 46 seconds caused the spacecraft to land 386 km (240 mi) from the intended landing zone, in the inhospitable forests of Upper Kama Upland, somewhere west of Solikamsk. Although flight controllers had no idea where the spacecraft had landed or whether Leonov and Belyayev had survived, the cosmonauts' families were told that they were resting after having been recovered. The two men were both familiar with the harsh climate and knew that bears and wolves, made aggressive by mating season, lived in the taiga; the spacecraft carried a pistol and "plenty of ammunition", but the incident later drove the development of a dedicated TP-82 Cosmonaut survival pistol. Although aircraft quickly located the cosmonauts, the area was so heavily forested that helicopters could not land. When night arrived, the temperature dropped to −5 °C (23 °F), and the spacecraft's hatch had been blown open by explosive bolts. Warm clothes and supplies were dropped and the cosmonauts spent a freezing night in the capsule or Sharik in Russian. Even worse, the electrical system completely malfunctioned so that the heater would not work, but the fans ran at full blast. A rescue party arrived on skis the next day as it was too risky to try an airlift from the site. The advance party chopped wood and built a small log cabin and an enormous fire. After a more comfortable second night in the forest, the cosmonauts skied to a waiting helicopter several kilometers away and flew first to Perm, then to Baikonur for their mission debriefing.

General Nikolai Kamanin's diary later gave the landing location of the Voskhod 2, about 75 kilometres (47 miles) from Perm in the Ural mountains in heavy forest at 59°34′N 55°28′E on 19 March 1965 09:02 GMT. Initially, there was some confusion and it was believed that Voskhod 2 landed not far from Shchuchin (about 30 kilometres or 19 miles south-west of Bereznikov, north of Perm), but no indication was received from the spacecraft. Apparently a commander of one of the search helicopters reported finding Voskhod 2, "On the forest road between the villages of Sorokovaya and Shchuchino, about 30 kilometers southwest of the town of Berezniki, I see the red parachute and the two cosmonauts. There is deep snow all around..."

The capsule is currently on display at the museum of RKK Energiya in Korolev, near Moscow.

== Spacewalk ==
On reaching orbit in Voskhod 2, Leonov and Belyayev attached the EVA backpack to Leonov's Berkut ("Golden Eagle") space suit, a modified Vostok Sokol-1 intravehicular (IV) suit. The white metal EVA backpack provided 45 minutes of oxygen for breathing and cooling. Oxygen vented through a relief valve into space, carrying away heat, moisture, and exhaled carbon dioxide. The space suit pressure could be set at either 40.6 kPa (5.89 psi) or 27.40 kPa (3.974 psi).

Belyayev then deployed and pressurised the Volga inflatable airlock. The airlock was necessary for two reasons: first, the capsule's avionics used vacuum tubes, which required a constant atmosphere for air cooling. Also, supplies of nitrogen and oxygen sufficient to replenish the atmosphere after EVA could not be carried due to the spacecraft's weight limit. By contrast, the American Gemini capsule used solid state avionics, and an atmosphere of oxygen only, at a pressure of 69 kPa (10.0 psi), which could easily be replenished after EVA. The Volga airlock was designed, built, and tested in nine months in mid-1964. At launch, Volga fit over the hatch of Voskhod 2, extending 74 cm (29 in) beyond the spacecraft's hull. The airlock comprised a 1.2 m (3.9 ft) wide metal ring fitted over the inward-opening hatch of Voskhod 2, a double-walled fabric airlock tube with a deployed length of 2.5 m (8.2 ft), and a 1.2 m (3.9 ft) wide metal upper ring around the 65 cm (26 in) wide inward-opening airlock hatch. Volga's deployed internal volume was 2.50 m^{3} (88 cu ft).

The fabric airlock tube was made rigid by about 40 airbooms, clustered as three independent groups. Two groups sufficed for deployment. The airbooms needed seven minutes to fully inflate. Four spherical tanks held sufficient oxygen to inflate the airbooms and pressurise the airlock. Two lights lit the airlock interior, and three 16mm cameras — two in the airlock, one outside on a boom-mounted to the upper ring — recorded the historic first spacewalk.

Belyayev controlled the airlock from inside Voskhod 2, but a set of backup controls for Leonov was suspended on bungee cords inside the airlock. Leonov entered the Volga, then Belyayev sealed Voskhod 2 behind him and depressurised the airlock. Leonov opened Volga's outer hatch and pushed out to the end of his 5.35 m (17.6 ft) umbilicus. He later said the umbilicus gave him tight control of his movements — an observation purportedly belied by subsequent American spacewalk experience. Leonov reported looking down and seeing from the Straits of Gibraltar to the Caspian Sea.

After Leonov returned to his couch, Belyayev fired pyrotechnic bolts to discard the Volga. Sergei Korolev, Chief Designer at OKB-1 Design Bureau (now RKK Energia), stated after the EVA that Leonov could have remained outside for much longer than he did, while Mstislav Keldysh, "chief theoretician" of the Soviet space program and President of the Soviet Academy of Sciences, said that the EVA showed that future cosmonauts would find work in space easy.

The government news agency, TASS, reported that, "outside the ship and after returning, Leonov feels well"; however, post-Cold War Russian documents reveal a different story — that Leonov's Berkut space suit ballooned, making bending difficult. Because of this, Leonov was unable to reach the shutter switch on his thigh for his chest-mounted camera. He could not take pictures of Voskhod 2, but was able to recover the camera mounted on Volga which recorded his EVA for posterity but only after it stuck and he had to exert considerable effort to push it down in front of him. After 12 minutes walking in space Leonov re-entered Volga.

Later accounts report Cosmonaut Leonov violated procedure by entering the airlock head-first, then became stuck sideways when he turned to close the outer hatch, forcing him to flirt with decompression sickness (the "bends") by lowering the suit pressure so he could bend to free himself. Leonov said that he had a suicide pill to swallow had he been unable to re-enter the Voskhod 2, and Belyayev been forced to abandon him in orbit.

Doctors reported that Leonov nearly suffered heatstroke — his core body temperature increased by 1.8 °C (3.2 °F) in 20 minutes; Leonov said he was up to his knees in sweat, which sloshed in the suit. In an interview published in the Soviet Military Review in 1980, Leonov downplayed his difficulties, saying that "building manned orbital stations and exploring the Universe are inseparably linked with man's activity in open space. There is no end of work in this field".

== Crew recovery ==
The capsule touched down on land in the Perm region of Russia. It missed the intended landing site by approximately 386 kilometres (240 mi; 208 nmi). This was due to a failure in the navigation system which caused the automated braking system to fail. To correct this problem as much as possible the crew manually controlled the braking system to deorbit and land the capsule. Once the capsule touched down and the crew was able to set foot back on soil the crew recovery had just begun.

Given that the capsule landed in a rural area with a tracking system that had an accuracy of 50–70 kilometers, the landing site was not immediately known. It was even admitted by General Nikolai Kamanin that officials were unaware of the landing for hours after touch down. Approximately 4 hours after the capsule touched down a helicopter spotted the capsule and crew. The location in which the capsule touched down was too dense for a helicopter to land and recover the crew. Leonov and Belyayev could have likely been recovered by a helicopter with the use of a rope and ladder but it was deemed too dangerous by the marshal of the aviation Rudenko. This resulted in Leonov and Belyayev spending a total of 3 days, two nights, in the forest before finally being recovered. The cosmonauts did come partially equipped for this situation taking a survival kit which included a knife and a pistol. Also, the two cosmonauts had experience that would aid them in this situation: Belyayev grew up in Chelishchevo with the dream of becoming a hunter, while Leonov had spent time in the wilderness alone as an artistic outlet. Throughout the nights the temperature would drop to −30 °C (−22 °F).

During this time helicopters dropped supplies for the cosmonauts including warm clothes, boots, water containers, and more. Helicopters also dropped doctors and technicians close to the landing site so they could trek to the landing site and support the cosmonauts. Others were also dropped by helicopters to start clearing a landing pad that was closer to the capsule. With more resources and supplies after their first night the landing site was more sustainable. This included a fire, a makeshift log cabin and they were even brought cheese, sausage, and bread for supper. After spending two cold nights in a dense forest, Leonov and Belyayev were able to ski 9 kilometres (5.6 mi; 4.9 nmi) with the help of some rescuers to reach the helicopters landing site. The cosmonauts were then flown to Perm and ultimately to Baikonur where they would have their first debriefing about the mission. The location at which Voskhod 2 touched down is marked by a plaque with a 400-meter-long wooden walkway to the destination. The path took approximately two weeks to complete by volunteers.

== In popular culture ==
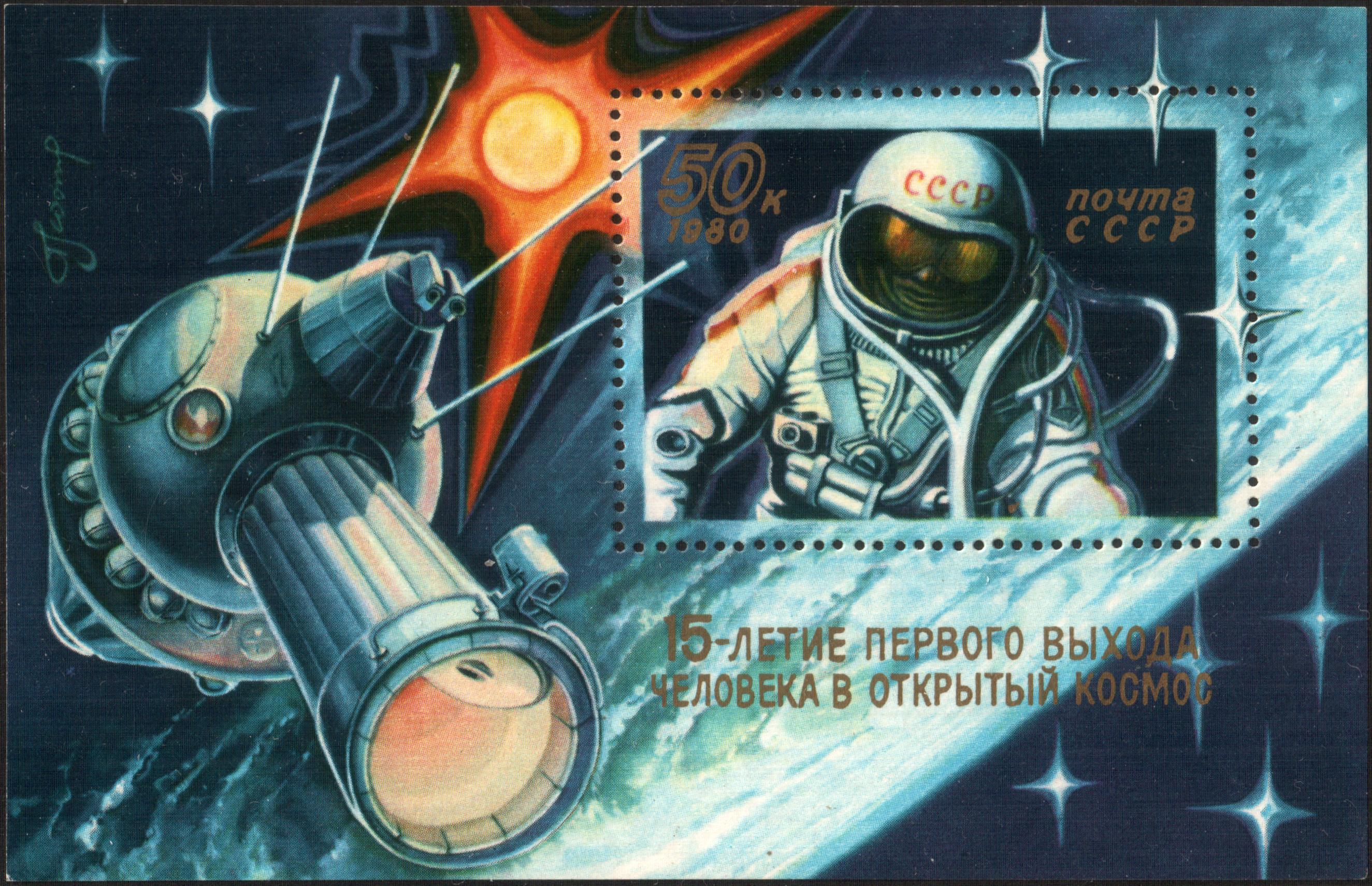
Soviet postage stamp for the 15th anniversary of the first human spacewalk, issued on 18 March 1980

- In 2015, the mission was depicted in the "Space" episode of Comedy Central's Drunk History, created by Derek Waters. Blake Anderson and Adam DeVine played Leonov and Belyayev.
- The mission is depicted in the 2017 Russian film The Age of Pioneers (Russian: Время первых, romanized: Vremya Pervykh), also known as Spacewalk, starring Yevgeny Mironov as Alexei Leonov and Konstantin Khabensky as Pavel Belyayev.
- In the pilot episode of the alternate history series For All Mankind, Voskhod 2 is the name given to the first crewed lunar landing, with Leonov walking on the Moon a few weeks before Apollo 11 arrives.
- This mission is the subject of the song "EVA" from the 2015 album The Race for Space by British alternative band Public Service Broadcasting.
- The inflatable airlock inspired a similar inflatable airlock in the space simulation game Kerbal Space Program.

== See also ==
- List of spacewalks
- Voskhod Spacecraft "Globus" IMP navigation instrument

Preceded by Voskhod 1 crew	Human altitude record 1965-1966	Succeeded by Gemini 10 crew
