= Vadim Valentinovich Pokrovsky =

- Russian: Вади́м Валенти́нович Покро́вский
- Born: 17 January 1955; Moscow, Russian SSR, Soviet Union
- Died: 20 May 2026 (aged 71); Moscow, Russian Federation
- Occupation: Epidemiologist
- Known for: Treating HIV/AIDS in Russia / expert Professor
- Relatives: Valentin Pokrovsky

Vadim Pokrovsky or Vadim Pokrovskii (Library of Congress transliteration) (17 January 1955 – 20 May 2026) was a Soviet and Russian epidemiologist and expert in infectious diseases, specialising in the prevention and treatment of HIV/AIDS. His work as head of the Specialized Research Department for AIDS Prevention and Control, and his advocacy for the rights of people living with HIV/AIDS made him one of the leading figures in the Soviet, and later the Russian, response to HIV.

== Life ==
Vadim Pokrovsky was born in 1955 in Moscow. His father was Valentin Pokrovsky (1929-2020), one of the Soviet Union’s leading epidemiologists who served as President of the Russian Academy of Sciences. Pokrovsky graduated in 1978 from the Faculty of General Medicine at the N.A. Semashko Stomatological Institute in Moscow (today known as the Russian University of Medicine), before completing a clinical residency at the Central Research Institute of Epidemiology. His PhD-level (kandidatskaia) dissertation was on the immunobiological properties of salmonella, before the HIV/AIDS crisis prompted a change of direction. His doctoral dissertation was on the epidemiology of the HIV infection, the field in which he worked for the rest of his life.

== Anti-AIDS work ==
Alongside his father, Pokrovsky was recognized as one of Russia’s leading experts in the epidemiology and prevention of HIV/AIDS. He was Head of the Specialized Research Department for AIDS Prevention and Control at the Central Research Institute of Epidemiology and also led the Federal Scientific-Methodological Centre for Prevention and Control of AIDS, which became the governing centre for the country’s network of regional AIDS centres. From 1987, Pokrovsky was head of the USSR’s first anonymous testing clinic at the 2nd Infectious Diseases Hospital in Moscow, providing free and confidential ELISA tests, consultations and counselling. He also helped identify the first officially-recognised Soviet HIV patient, a translator who had worked in Tanzania in the early 1980s. He also led the Soviet response to the Elista outbreak in 1988, a nosocomial outbreak among mothers and children, linked to the use of unsterilised needles. Michel Kazatchkine, former Executive Director of the Global Fund to Fight AIDS, Tuberculosis and Malaria, suggests that Pokrovsky took a "fairly heroic stand" in publicising the outbreak, when Soviet authorities would rather have remained silent.

In the 1990s, Pokrovsky, alongside Bella Denisenko, helped draft Federal Law No. 38-FZ of 30 March 1995 ("On the Prevention of the Spread in the Russian Federation of the Disease Caused by Human Immunodeficiency Virus (HIV Infection)"), which established the legal framework guaranteeing free medical care and rights protection for people living with HIV in Russia. As of 2026, the law remains in force. Pokrovsky also introduced innovative epidemiological methodologies to the country, including sentinel surveillance in place of mass-testing, helped guarantee anonymous testing, and conducted surveys via media and telephone. He also developed key national clinical standards, diagnostic protocols, and treatment guidelines. In a context where people living with HIV/AIDS were often discriminated against, Pokrovsky was of the most prominent voices campaigning to end social stigma, while at the same time calling for sex education, regular HIV testing, and better media coverage to help prevent the spread of HIV/AIDS.

Pokrovsky's advocacy for HIV prevention saw him clash with politicians and officials, both in the Soviet Union and Russian Federation. His advocacy for mandatory sex education in schools, and his promotion of safe sex were resisted by some Duma deputies, who accused him of immorality and labelled him "an agent acting against the interests of the state". In 2015, Pokrovsky suggested that the HIV epidemic was a "national disaster". He challenged the statistics disseminated by the Russian Ministry of Health. While the Ministry only counted registered patients (around 882,000), Pokrovsky and Rospotrebnadzor published higher figures, suggesting more than 1.23 million confirmed cases, adding that many individuals remained untested and unregistered.

== Other professional work ==
Pokrovsky was a distinguished scientist holding the title of Academician of the Russian Academy of Sciences (RAS), Professor, and Honoured Scientist of the Russian Federation. He served as a member of the Bureau of the Medical Sciences Division of the RAS and sat on the editorial boards of five scientific journals. In addition to his leadership role at Rospotrebnadzor's Central Research Institute of Epidemiology, he was a member of the scientific council and head of the Laboratory of Post-Genomic Technologies at the N.F. Izmerov Research Institute of Occupational Health.

Pokrovsky was a prolific scholar, authoring over 700 scientific publications, multiple books, and holding 11 patents. He established a renowned scientific school, training dozens of specialists who served as expert advisors for global bodies such as WHO and UNAIDS. His achievements earned him the State Prize of the Russian Federation, and he was also named an Honoured Scientist of the Russian Federation.
