= Igor Ushakov =

Igor Borisovich Ushakov (Russian: Игорь Борисович Ушаков; born October 28, 1954, in Tallinn, Estonia) is a Russian physiologist, Doctor of Medical Sciences, Professor, Academician of the Russian Academy of Sciences. Honoured Physician of the Russian Federation. From 2008 to 2015 he was Director of the Institute of Biomedical Problems. His rank is major general.

== Career ==
In 1977, he graduated with honors from the S.M. Kirov Military Medical Academy.

In 1995, he received the title of Professor.

He was elected a Member of the International Academy of Astronautics in 2003.

From 2005 to 2010, Ushakov headed the Department of Aviation and Space Medicine at the First Moscow State Medical University.

He was elected a Member of the Russian Academy of Medical Sciences in 2005.

He is currently Editor-in-Chief of the Russian journal Aviakosmicheskaya i Ekologicheskaya Meditsina.

Ushakov is the author 488 scientific works including 8 monographs.
