= Nikolai Izmerov =

Soviet-Russian public figure (1927–2016)

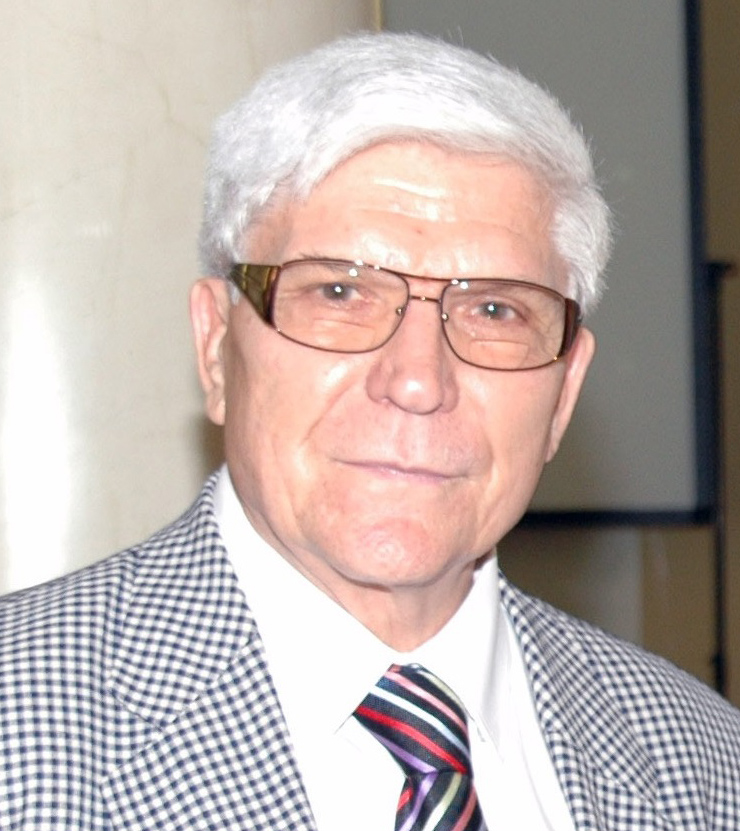
- Born: Nikolai Fedotovich Izmerov; 19 December 1927; Frunze, Soviet Union
- Died: 23 December 2016 (aged 89); Moscow, Russia
- Education: Tashkent medical Institute (in Tashkent, Uzbekistan)
- Known for: Occupational hygiene; Occupational safety and health; Environmental protection; Occupational disease
- Spouse: Izmerova Natalia Ivanovna (m. 1947)
- Awards: Member of the Russian Academy of Sciences
- Scientific career
- Fields: Hygiene
- Workplaces: Research institute of occupational health, First Moscow State Medical University

Nikolai Fedotovich Izmerov (Russian: Николай Федотович Измеров; 19 December 1927 – 23 December 2016) was a Soviet and Russian occupational hygienist and public figure, who made significant contributions to occupational hygiene.

== Early life ==
Nikolai Izmerov was born in Frunze (Bishkek today), Kyrgyzstan in 1927, to Izmerov Fedot Fedotovich (1885) and Izmerova Evdokia Filatovna (née Shemilina) (1892).

He was educated at a 10-years school in Jambul (Kyrgyzstan), and began studying to become a railway engineer. But after 2 years of study Izmerov entered the Tashkent Medical Institute (Faculty of Hygiene) in 1946.

Izmerov believed that his choice was determined by his Christian upbringing, received from believing parents; and by the sense of compassion for sick people he saw in hospitals.

== Early work ==
Izmerov entered the Central Institute of Advanced Medical Training (1952) after graduation in the Tashkent Medical Institute and Clinical Training in Hygiene. After additional studying, he became a senior inspector in the Ministry of Health in 1953–1955.

He prepared and defended the dissertation of the candidate of medical sciences “Air pollution with gasoline vapor and its maximum permissible concentration” at the Central Institute of Advanced Medical Training in 1958.

Izmerov became Deputy head of the Department of External Relations of the Ministry of Health of the USSR in 1960, and in 1962-64 — Deputy Minister of health, and chief sanitary doctor of the RSFSR. N. Izmerov developed standards for occupational and environmental hygiene. He continued his work in this area even later.

== In World Health Organization ==
He had been recommended to work in the World Health Organization (WHO) as assistant Director-General by the Ministry of Health; and he worked in Geneva for 7 years from 1964 to 1971. Izmerov was responsible for environmental health: environmental toxicants, water and air pollutants. He guided the United States to establish their National Water Programmes. His work has influenced the WHO's significant contributions to the UN International Water Decade 1965–1974. Izmerov's experience gained in developing hygiene standards previously helped him to do this work.

== Research Institute of Occupational Health and Diseases (AMS) ==
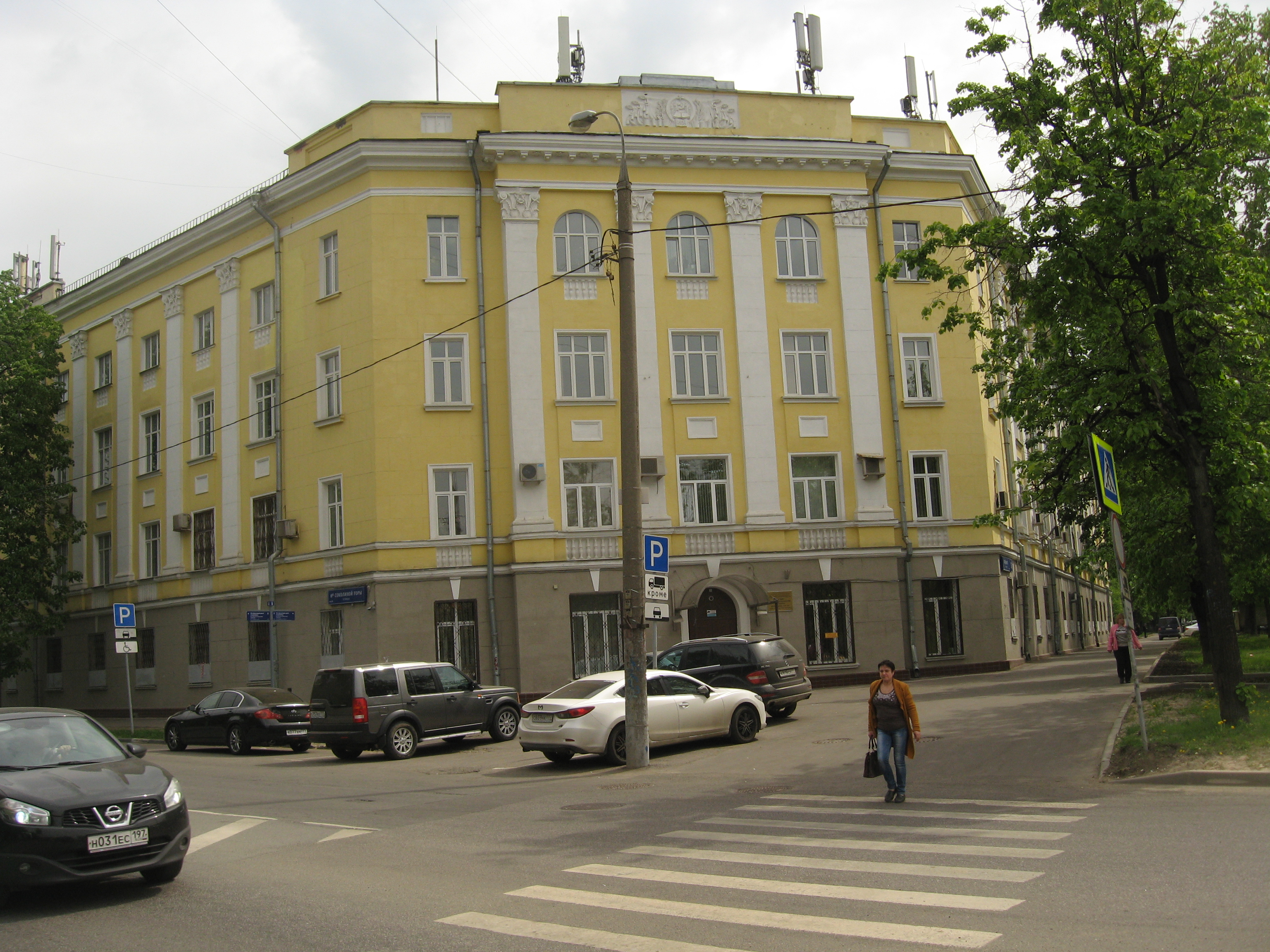
Izmerov Research Institute of Occupational Health (created on June 20, 1923).

Izmerov returned to Moscow in 1971 and was elected head of the Research Institute of Occupational Health and Diseases (in Academy of Medical Sciences, the leading institute in this field in the USSR and in RF, and the world's oldest scientific institute of occupational diseases). As the head of the institute (director from 1971 to 2012, scientific director from 2012 to 2015) he has done a lot to improve the work of the institute: the development of fundamental research in the field of occupational health, the development of permissible exposure limits, the development of manuals and textbooks, the implementation of research results in the practice of protection of workers. Some of the toxicological research results were used by the World Health Organization (WHO) and the International Programme on Chemical Safety.

The work of the institute (and other similar institutions) received a positive assessment from the American specialists earlier.

The director of the institute focused the attention of his experienced and qualified staff on the development of methods of prevention of occupational diseases; principles and methods of improving working conditions, the environment, and saving the health of workers. The institute became one of the leading occupational health institutes in the world. Izmerov signatories of the WHO "Declaration on Occupational Health for All" in 1994 as a director of a leading national OHS Institute.

The institute established the Laboratory of Women's Occupational Health (in 1974), the Department of Social and Hygienic Research, equipped with modern technology and successfully implementing the latest technology.

The specific features of the Soviet centralized planned state management led to the fact that the scientific developments of the institute became the requirements of legislation very often, and they were implemented in the enterprises. A characteristic feature of these works in the field of occupational health was their focus on the elimination of the causes of diseases and their prevention. This occupational medicine was integrated with the public health system and with the general sanitary hygiene services. According to Western hygienists, this feature led to the fact that the developed requirements were "too idealistic."

Izmerov became a doctor of medical sciences in 1973; professor in 1977; and a corresponding member of the Academy of Medical Sciences in 1980. He continued international activities (Note: Izmerov, N.F. (1973). "Control of air pollution in the USSR". Public Health Papers. 54. Geneva: World Health Organization: 1–157. hdl:10665/62929. PMID 4802086. Translated on: English, French, Spanish) as the institute director. Izmerov became an academician in 1986.

The institute developed exposure limits for chemicals, physical hazards., and non-toxic dust (which causes pneumoconiosis). If the low level of science and technology did not allow to fulfill the requirements, then the institute has developed a classification of working conditions according to the degree of danger (classes of work); and led the development of alternative methods of protecting health (aka. protection by reducing exposure time; protection by distance and shielding, etc.). Izmerov led the development of risk assessment methods for the cases of the employee's simultaneous exposure to the various types of occupational hazards. The institute was established Museum of Occupational Hygiene in 1987 (Note: "Museum "History of Labour Hygiene and Occupational Pathology"". www.Russian Museums.info. Moscow. Occupational Hygiene and Health Care History Museum. Detailed information on the website of the Institute.)

Nikolai Izmerov published over 500 journal papers (and other publications), several textbooks and manuals; and created a school of hygienists. 27 candidates and 32 doctors of science were trained under his leadership and during his consultations. He was editor of the articles in the Great Medical Encyclopedia, and ILO OHS Encyclopedia; (Note: Nicolai Izmerov; Igor Fedotov (1998). "Chapter 16. Labour Protection in the Russian Federation: Law and Practice". In Jeanne Mager Stellmann (ed.). Encyclopedia of Occupational Health & Safety. Volume 1, Part 2. Health Care. Paragraph "Occupational Health Services" (4 ed.). Geneva: International Labour Organization. pp. 538–542. Translated on: Russian (2001), Chinese, French, Japanese, Italian, German, Portuguese, Serbian, Spanish, Swahili) and chief editor of the magazine "Occupational Health and Industrial Ecology". (Note: Occupational Health and Industrial Ecology ("Labour Hygiene and Occupational Diseases" in 1957-1992). Official site of journal. Publisher: FSBSI Izmerov Research Institute of Occupational Health (in: Federal Service for the Oversight of Consumer Protection and Welfare). ISSN 1026-9428 Retrieved 2 Fedraury 2019.) Izmerov worked at the First Moscow State Medical University as head of the department of occupational health.

== Work in new socioeconomic conditions (1991-2016) ==
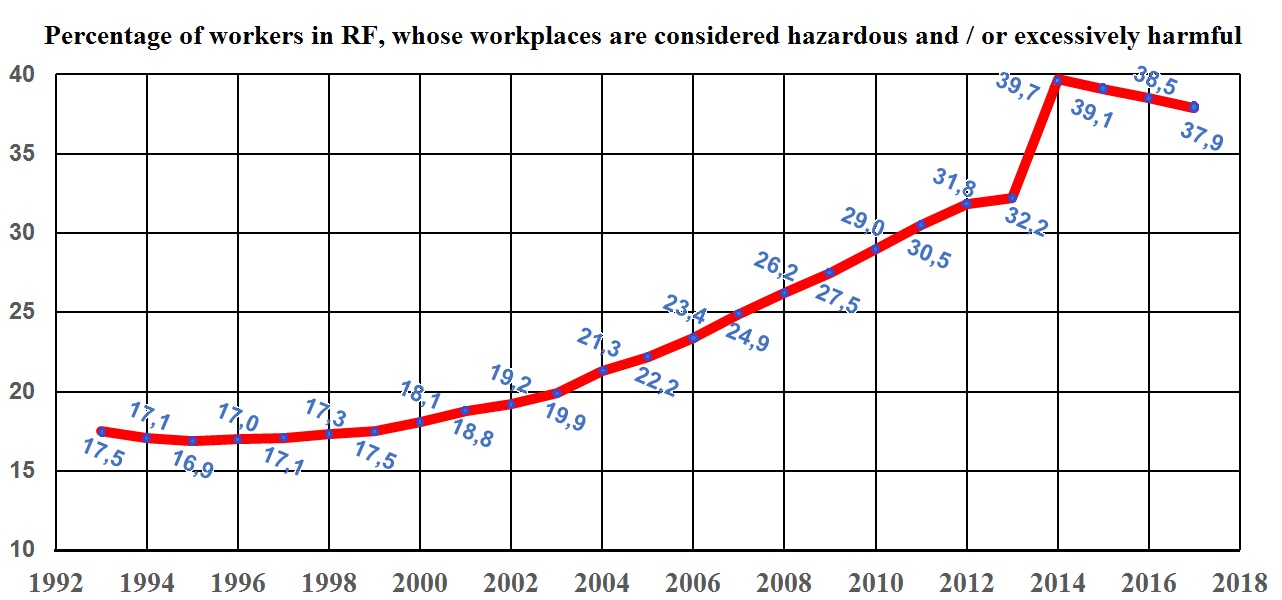

The destruction of the planned Soviet economy dealt a heavy blow to the national economy, and a very strong blow to the occupational health and safety system. Academician Izmerov, as a highly qualified and experienced professional, was well aware of the consequences of irresponsible actions, and was sensitive to the destruction of a scientifically based system of the workers' health protection.

The system of registration of occupational diseases had not normally operated in the USSR since 1936: most of the cases of occupational diseases were not registered for ideological reasons, to simulate a good state of occupational health, and to demonstrate the advantages of the soviet state system. It was bad, but the state still seriously tried to improve working conditions and provide preventive medical care to employees directly at the enterprises (as a priority). This approach has been used in other countries later. For example, the Hyundai Motor Company used the instruction (which was translated from Russian to Korean) to organize the medical care of its employees

But after 1991, the preservation of the negative tradition (not registering occupational diseases) allowed the new owners of enterprises to be guaranteed a complete lack of responsibility for damage to the health of employees - and they took advantage of this:

... the numbers of work accidents and the incidence of occupational injuries and diseases … remain unacceptably high, which may have serious consequences in terms of the deterioration of workers’ health …

... now workers have to pay with their health to survive ...

... the mortality rate of citizens of the RF at working age is 4.5 times higher than that in the European Union, and exceeds the mortality rate developing countries 1.5 times ... "

Registration of a small proportion of cases of occupational diseases. (and accidents) deprives the OHS system of the "feedback" pile: employers do not bear the consequences for irresponsible actions. In his eyes, the new owners of enterprises, interested only in obtaining financial profits in the short term, almost completely destroyed the medical units that were available in all large enterprises with harmful working conditions. Workers were left without normal medical prevention. The significant deterioration of the conditions in the workplaces contributed to the sharp decline in life expectancy for men. For example, 65 years for those born in 1987 and only 57 years for those born in 1992. Those workers who reach retirement age suffered from one or two diseases in 70% of cases. The reason is that employees work in poor conditions, did not undergo medical examinations, the diseases are detected too late and them not treated

Academician Izmerov used all his authority and all his powers to change this situation. The concept and project of the Presidential Program “Health of the Working Population of Russia for 2004-2015” was developed under the leadership of Izmerov, and it was reviewed by specialists. Then the program was reviewed and approved by the State Duma of the Russian Federation.

However, a change in the country's leadership, in general, did not change the new attitude to occupational health. The program was not implemented; the registration of an insignificant share of occupational diseases was preserved, and it was supplemented by incomplete registration of fatal accidents at workplaces. (Note: Table 2 on page 11: Number of the workers, killed at the workplaces.: Year / Russian Federal State Statistics Service / Social Insurance Fund of the Russian Federation / Federal service for labor and employment (Роструд) / Maximum discrepancy in the data; 2001 / 4368 / 5755 / 6194 / 1826; 2002 / 3920 / 5715 / 5865 / 1945; 2003 / 3536 / 5180 / 5185 / 1649; 2004 / 3292 / 4684 / 4924 / 1632; 2005 / 3091 / 4235 / 4604 / 1513; 2006 / 2881 / 3591 / 4301 / 1420; 2007 / 2966 / 3677 / 4417 / 1451; 2008 / 2548 / 3238 / 3931 / 1383; 2009 / 1967 / 2598 / 3200 / 1233; 2010 / 2004 / 2438 / 3120 / 1116; According to prof. Oleg Rusak, three state bodies cannot count the number of people killed in accidents at workplaces. According to Rostrud, it was revealed 2074 hidden accidents at work. Employers were hidden 64 group accidents and 404 deaths, 1332 severe accidents (2008). Source: O. Rusak, A. Tsvetkova. (2013). "Registration, investigation, and calculation of Accident" (PDF). Life Safety. Occupational Health & Safety; and public health (1). Moscow: Publisher LLC "New Technologies": 6–12. ISSN 1684-6435. (On Russian)) Izmerov didn't hear from either the employers, or leaders of the country.

Izmerov organized, and he led the preparation and holding (until 2015) of all-Russian congresses with international participation "Profession and Health" (since 2002). (Note: Russian National Congress with international participation “Occupation and health” Official site. Retrieved 30 January 2019.)

Izmerov was a member of International Committee on Occupational medicine (Stockholm, Sweden), Collegium Ramazzini (Italy), Chinese Academy of Preventive Medicine (PRC) etc.

== Personal life ==
Izmerov was married to Tatyana Nikolaevna Naumova (born 1924) in 1955. They lived together for 20 years, in 1961 their daughter Catherine was born. In 1976, a divorce occurred.

Izmerov married Natalia Ivanovna Demicheva (born 1947) in 1985. Natalia Ivanovna (born 1947) is a professor, dermatovenerologist, specialist in occupational diseases.

He had two daughters, four granddaughters, and one grandson.

Izmerov was fond of poetry, classical music, and ballet.

== Death ==
Izmerov died on December 23, 2016, after a long and serious illness in Moscow, (Note: Editorial office (2017). "In memory of Nikolai Fedotovich". Occupational Health and Industrial Ecology (in Russian) (1): 1–2. ISSN 1026-9428. Monument in the cemetery) and was buried at Troyekurovskoye Cemetery.

The Research Institute of Occupational Medicine of the RAS was named after academician Izmerov in 2017 by order of the Director of the Federal Agency of Scientific Organizations (FANO).

== Awards ==
- Order of the Red Banner of Labour (in 1969 and 1977)
- Order of the October Revolution (1987)
- Order "For Merit to the Fatherland" 2nd (2008), 3rd (2003) and 4th classes (1997).
- Laureate of the Russian Federation government prize in science and technology (2001).
- The title of "Honored Scientist of the Russian Federation" (1994)

Number of the workers, killed at the workplaces.
Year	Russian Federal State Statistics Service	Social Insurance Fund of the Russian Federation	Federal service for labor and employment (Роструд)	Maximum discrepancy in the data
2001	4368	5755	6194	1826
2002	3920	5715	5865	1945
2003	3536	5180	5185	1649
2004	3292	4684	4924	1632
2005	3091	4235	4604	1513
2006	2881	3591	4301	1420
2007	2966	3677	4417	1451
2008	2548	3238	3931	1383
2009	1967	2598	3200	1233
2010	2004	2438	3120	1116
According to prof. Oleg Rusak, three state bodies cannot count the number of people killed in accidents at workplaces. According to Rostrud, it was revealed 2074 hidden accidents at work. Employers were hidden 64 group accidents and 404 deaths, 1332 severe accidents (2008). Source: O. Rusak, A. Tsvetkova. (2013). "Registration, investigation, and calculation of Accident" (PDF). Life Safety. Occupational Health & Safety; and public health (1). Moscow: Publisher LLC "New Technologies": 6–12. ISSN 1684-6435. (On Russian)
