= Igor Gundarov =

Russian physician

Igor Alekseevich Gundarov (Russian: Игорь Алексеевич Гундаров; born 11 May 1947, Maykop) is a Russian scientist, professor, Doctor of Medicine, member of the Russian Academy of Natural Sciences, candidate of philosophical sciences and a specialist in the field of epidemiology and medical statistics.

== Career ==
Gundarov graduated from a special residency to work in the countries of Asia and Africa, courses in epidemiology in Berlin and the London School of Hygiene and Tropical Diseases.

Gundarov is Head of the laboratory of the State Research Center for Preventive Medicine of the Ministry of Health, an expert of the State Duma of the Russian Federation, a professor at Moscow State University, head of a laboratory at the Research Institute of Public Health and Health Management of the First Moscow State Medical University a member of the Presidium of the All-Russian Public Council on the quality of life of citizens of the Russian Federation.

During the COVID-19 pandemic, Gundarov said that the danger of COVID-19 is small, that the mortality statistics are greatly overestimated for financial reasons, especially in Western countries with their commercial medicine. On the situation in Russia, he said that high-ranking officials are spreading information that does not correspond to scientific data, and the restrictions imposed by the mayor of Moscow for residents are not justified and erroneous.
