= Herman Obuhov =

Russian-American author

- Герман Обухов
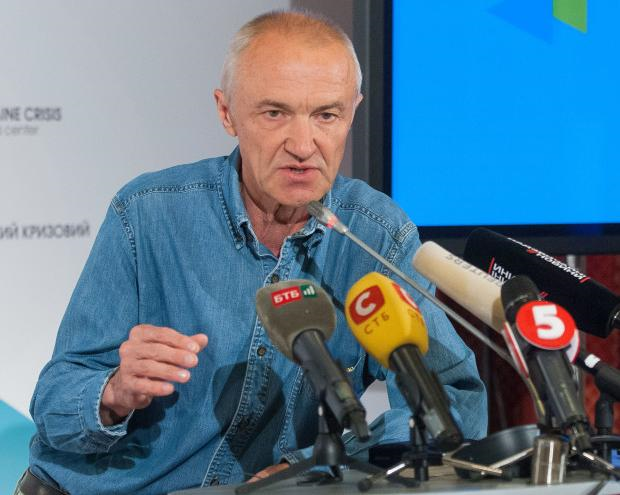
- Obuhov in 2014
- Born: 27 November 1949 (age 76); Chelyabinsk, Russian SFSR, Soviet Union
- Citizenship: Soviet Union (1949–1988); United States (1995–present); Russian Federation (1999–present)
- Education: Leningrad Electrotechnical University (1975)
- Known for: human rights activism
- Movement: dissident movement in the Soviet Union

Herman Viktorovich Obuhov (Russian: Герман Викторович Обухов; born 27 November 1949) is a Russian-American public figure, political prisoner of the USSR 1981–87. Founder and head of the "Stop Russian Terror" Foundation, author of five books and six screenplays, one of the founders of the "Open the World to Children" Charities.

== Biography ==
Born into the family of a scientist in the field of automatic control theory. In 1966 graduated from School No. 1 in Minsk, graduated in 1975 from Leningrad Electrotechnical University (LETI), specializing in design of radio-electronic equipment. After graduating from the University, he worked as a medical equipment engineer at the Institute of Experimental Medicine of the USSR Academy of Medical Sciences (IEM AMS USSR), and then in the central clinical diagnostic laboratory of the clinic of the First Leningrad Medical Institute.

=== Social and political activities in Soviet period ===
In the 1970s, he began writing poetry and short stories; this period of his life also saw him work on the book "The Extinguished Dawn". Ludmila Alekseeva mentions that in this book, Obuhov criticizes the foreign and domestic policies of the CPSU from a Marxist standpoint. Speaking about the book, Obuhov himself emphasized that he "made an attempt to impartially analyze both the ideas for creating a communist society and the development of a socialist state". In those same years, he began actively contacting students from American universities who came to Leningrad State University (LSU) for an internship to study Russian language and literature, as well as contacting correspondents from Western newspapers and magazines.

=== Arrest and "political zones" ===
On 3 September 1981, he was arrested in Moscow while attempting to pass over his book manuscript to Annie Chevallier, an Editor of the Gallimard Publishing House, and on 27 November 1981, he was sentenced to 4 years of imprisonment and 2 years of exile. "I was charged with anti-Soviet propaganda and agitation," recalls Herman Obuhov, "and after my term expired, the authorities suggested that I leave the country. Herman Obuhov served his sentence in the strict regime labor camp of the Perm region (Perm-35 and Perm-37). It is known that on 30 October 1983, on Political Prisoner's Day in the USSR, in camp VS-389/37, Obuhov went on hunger strike in protest against judicial arbitrariness, demanding recognition of his status as a political prisoner]. From September 21, 1985, he served his exile in the village of Ayan in Khabarovsk Krai.

After his release, the authorities forced Obuhov to leave the USSR. In March 1988 he left Leningrad for Great Britain at the invitation of Amnesty International in London and with the support of Lancing College. His Soviet citizenship was cancelled. Then in the same year he moved to the United States, since the U.S. Congress granted him political asylum in absentia. In the United States, he worked in his primary specialty as an electronic (now medical) equipment engineer at the Yale New Haven Hospital (YNHH). Since 1990, after the collapse of the USSR, he began to regularly visit Russia. In 1993, he received US citizenship, and from 1998 to 2006 he lived and worked in St. Petersburg.

=== Social and political activities in post-Soviet period ===
In 1991, Herman Obuhov initiated and founded the Russian-American Council for Economic Development (RACED) with the participation of the First Mayor of St. Petersburg Anatoly Sobchak. Obuhov took an active part in many conferences and seminars dedicated to the new Russia, in which U.S. Congressmen and Senators participated. From 1998 to 2004, he was an advisor on international affairs in the Legislative Assembly of St. Petersburg. In 2002, while remaining the executive director of RACED, he founded the International Charitable Foundation "Open the World to Children" together with the former Consul General of the United States in St. Petersburg Jack Gosnell and the President of the Charitable Foundation "Children's Alliance (USA)" Debbie McFadden. This foundation was engaged in the computerization of orphanages. More than two thousand orphans were able to acquire computer skills and find friends all over the world. In his interview, Herman Obuhov notes that computerization is one of the mechanisms for the adaptation of "both children and youth in this world". The foundation was established in St. Petersburg, and a branch of the foundation is registered in the United States. The foundation had the status of an International Foundation due to the fact that its Board of Trustees included not only citizens of Russia, such as Nobel Prize winner academician Zhores Alferov, but also citizens of the United States (Jack Gosnell) and France (Count Pyotr Sheremetev). In 2014, HermanObuhov took an active part in the Revolution of Dignity in Ukraine and moved from the United States to Kyiv. In 2017, Herman Obuhov, together with like-minded people, founded another foundation, Stop Inform Terror, aimed at countering Russian propaganda. In 2023, this foundation changed its name to Stop Russian Terror, the purpose of which is not only to promote a speedy end to the war but also the liberation of all Ukrainian territories occupied by Russian troops and humanitarian aid to Ukraine.

== Creative activity ==
In the post-Soviet period, Herman Obuhov wrote and published five books: The Extinguished Dawn 15 Years Later, The Times of the Filibusters, The Confiscated Letters, The Chasm and The Stolen Country, as well as six screenplays: Flight to Johannesburg, New Jersey Turnpike, Gold Bird in a Gold Cage, Titian's Gift, My Alaska and Trump's Friend – Head of the Russian Mafia. Herman has written and published on various sites, including Radio Liberty, more than 300 articles on various social and political topics.
