= Konchalovsky =

Russian surname

Konchalovsky is a Russian surname.

Notable people with this surname include:

- Pyotr Konchalovsky (1876–1956), Russian painter;
- Andrei Konchalovsky (born 1937), Russian film writer and director, grandson of Pyotr.
