= Alexander Gavrilenko =

Russian cardiac surgeon

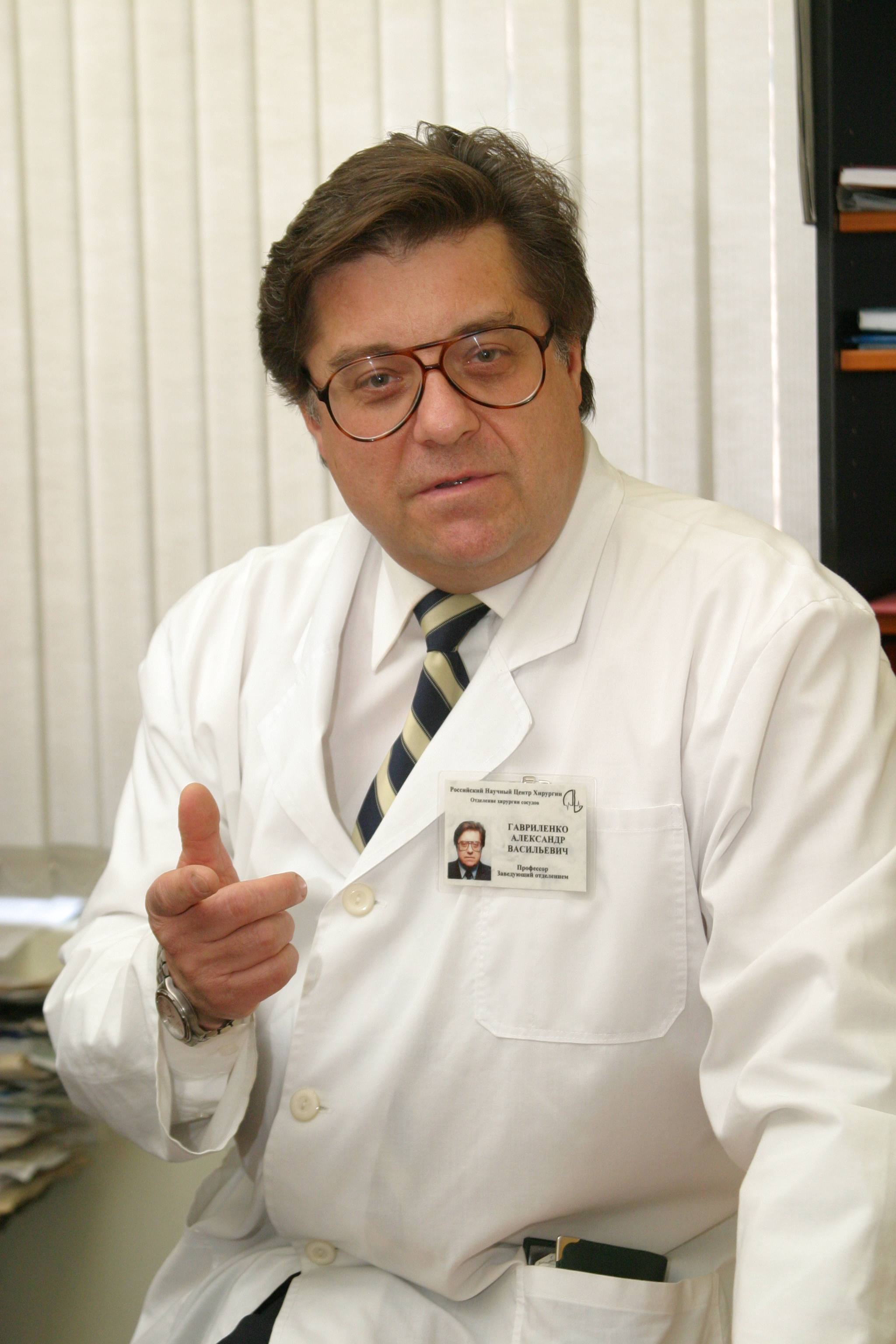
- Gavrilenko in 2004
- Born: Alexander Vasilievich Gavrilenko; 15 February 1950 (age 76); Moscow, Russia
- Occupation: Cardiac surgeon

Alexander Vasilievich Gavrilenko (Russian: Александр Васильевич Гавриленко; born 15 February 1950) is a Russian cardiac surgeon. He has been a corresponding member of the USSR Academy of Medical Sciences since 2004, and a full member (academician) of the Russian Academy of Sciences since 2016. He was honored the medals, such as, Order of Friendship of Peoples, Medal "In Commemoration of the 850th Anniversary of Moscow", Russian Federation Presidential Certificate of Honour and the Honored Scientist of the Russian Federation. In 2017, Gavrilenko was awarded the Order of Nikolai Pirogov by the European Academy of Sciences and Arts.
