= Arkady Arkanov =

Russian writer, doctor, playwright and stand-up comedian

- Аркадий Арканов
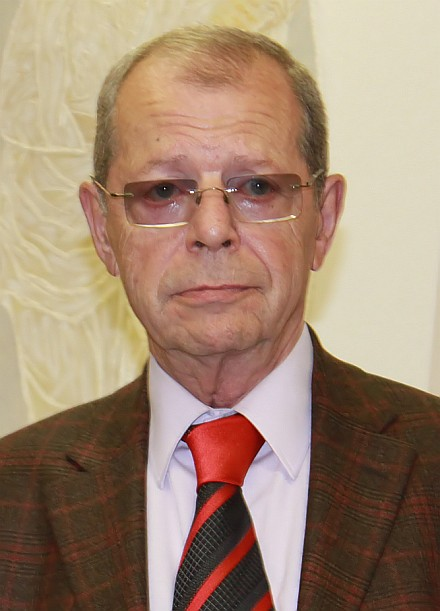
- Arkanov in 2009
- Born: Arkady Mikhailovich Steinbock; Аркадий Михайлович Штейнбок; 7 June 1933; Kyiv, Soviet Union (now Ukraine)
- Died: 22 March 2015 (aged 81); Moscow, Russia
- Education: I.M. Sechenov First Moscow State Medical University

Comedy career
- Genres: Comedy, melodrama
- Arkady Arkanov's voice Recorded at the Echo of Moscow program on 26 October 2006

Arkady Mikhailovich Arkanov (Russian: Аркадий Михайлович Арканов; 7 June 1933 – 22 March 2015) was a Russian writer, doctor, playwright and stand-up comedian.

== Biography ==
Arkanov was born Arkady Mikhailovich Steinbock in Kyiv, USSR. At the onset of World War II in 1941, he was evacuated to Siberia, together with his mother and younger brother. In April 1943, the family was reunited with their father in Moscow.

In 1957, Arkanov graduated from the I.M. Sechenov First Moscow State Medical University and, before becoming a writer, worked as a family doctor. Between 1963 and 1967, he was a satirist at the journal Yunost. In 1966, he changed his last name, and in 1968 became a member of the Union of Soviet Writers. In the 1960s–70s, he collaborated with Grigori Gorin, with whom he wrote several plays for the Moscow Theater of Satire.

Arkanov's first marriage was to Maya Kristalinskaya, a singer in 1967. After their divorce, Arkanov married Yevgeniya Morozova. He had a son, Vasily Arkadievich Arkanov (born 1967), a Russian-English translator and journalist who has lived in New York since 1993. He was a holder of the title People's Artist of Russia and awarded the Order of Honour.
