= Anatoly Pokrovsky =

Russian surgeon (1930–2022)

Anatoly Pokrovsky Анатолий Покровский
- Born: 21 November 1930; Minsk, Byelorussian SSR, USSR
- Died: 2 June 2022 (aged 91)
- Citizenship: Russian Federation
- Education: Voronezh Medical Institute
- Scientific career
- Fields: Vascular surgery
- Workplaces: Russian Academy of Medical Sciences

Anatoly Vladimirovich Pokrovsky (Russian: Анатолий Владимирович Покровский; 21 November 1930 – 2 June 2022) was a Russian vascular surgeon.

== Positions ==
- Chief of Vascular Surgery Department at Vishnevsky Institute of Surgery of Russian Academy of Medical Sciences
- Head of the Department of Angiology and Vascular Surgery of Russian Medical Academy for Post-Graduate Education
- Chief editor of "Angiology and vascular surgery" monthly journal (in Russian)
- President of Russian Association of Angiologists and Vascular Surgeons
- President of European Society for Vascular Surgery (in 2000)
- Honorary member of American Association for Vascular Surgery
