= Boris Yegorov =

Soviet physician and cosmonaut (1937–1994)

- Борис Егоров
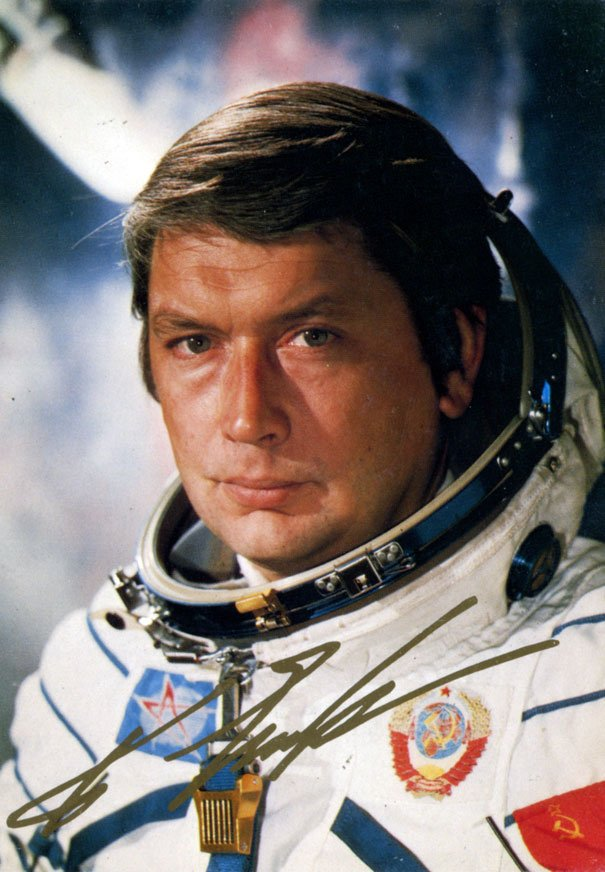
- Born: Boris Borisovich Yegorov; 26 November 1937; Moscow, Soviet Union
- Died: 12 September 1994 (aged 56); Moscow, Russia
- Occupation: Doctor
- Space career

Cosmonaut
- Time in space: 1d 00h 17m
- Selection: Civilian Specialist Group 1
- Missions: Voskhod 1

Boris Borisovich Yegorov (Russian: Бори́с Бори́сович Его́ров; November 26, 1937 – September 12, 1994) was a Soviet and Russian physician and cosmonaut who became the first physician to travel to space.

He was born in Moscow and received his medical degree from the Moscow Medical Institute in 1961. Yegorov earned his doctorate in medicine, with his specialization being in disorders of the sense of balance.

Yegorov was selected as a member of the multi-disciplinary team that flew on Voskhod 1. It has been suggested that his father's influence within the Politburo may have had some bearing on the selection. As a result of this space flight, Yegorov was awarded the title of the Hero of the Soviet Union on October 19, 1964.

In 1994, at the age of 56, he died of a heart attack.

== Early life and education ==
Yegorov came from a medical background, with his father a prominent heart surgeon, and his mother an ophthalmologist. He also selected medicine as a career and graduated from the First Moscow State Medical University in 1961. During the course of his studies, he came into contact with Yuri Gagarin's training and became interested in space medicine.

Boris Yegorov was born on November 26, 1937, in Moscow, Soviet Union (now Russia). He showed an early interest in medicine and pursued his passion by enrolling in the Moscow Medical Institute. Yegorov excelled in his studies and graduated in 1961 with a medical degree.

== Career ==
Following his graduation, Yegorov began working as a researcher at the Institute of Biomedical Problems and the Institute of Medical and Biological Problems. His work focused on space medicine, and he soon became an expert in the field.

In 1964, Yegorov was selected to undergo cosmonaut training and join the Soviet space program. His expertise in space medicine made him an ideal candidate for the role, and he quickly proved himself as a skilled cosmonaut.

On October 12, 1964, Yegorov made history as a member of the Voskhod 1 crew. The mission was significant in that it was the first to carry more than one crew member and the first to use a multi-person spacecraft. During the flight, Yegorov conducted medical experiments to study the effects of spaceflight on the human body. He also monitored the health of his fellow crew members and provided medical assistance when needed, demonstrating his skill as a physician.

After his successful spaceflight, Yegorov continued his work in space medicine and became a professor at the Moscow Medical Institute. He was involved in the development of medical equipment for use in space and contributed significantly to the understanding of the effects of spaceflight on the human body.

== Honors ==
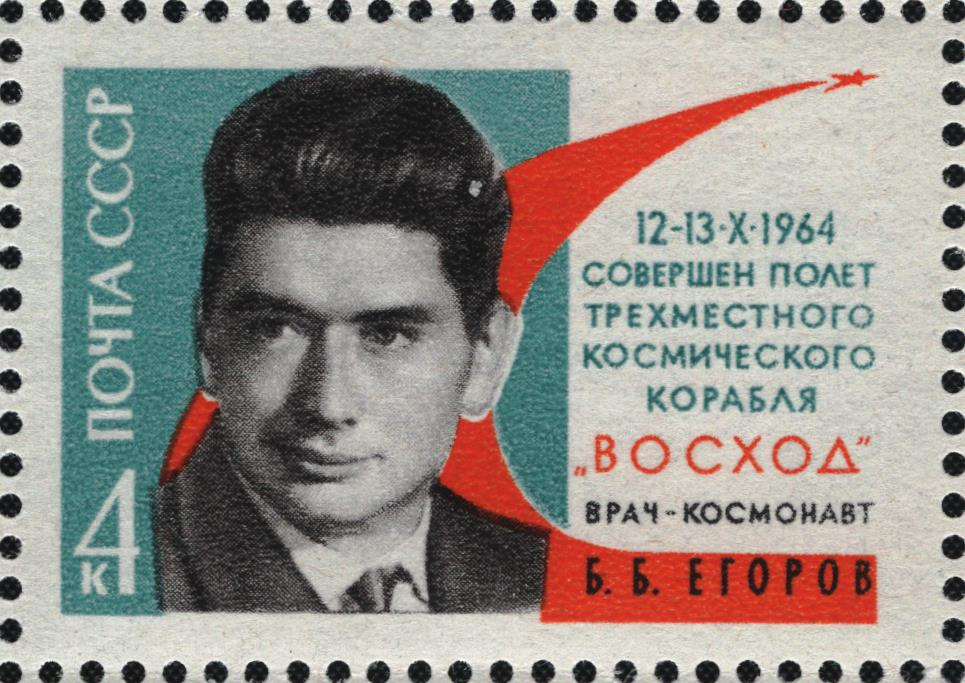
1964 USSR postage stamp honouring Boris Yegorov

He was awarded:

- Hero of the Soviet Union
- Pilot-Cosmonaut of the USSR
- Order of Lenin
- Order of the Red Banner of Labour
- Medal "For the Development of Virgin Lands"
- Nine jubilee medals
- Hero of Socialist Labour (Vietnam)
- Banner Order of the Hungarian People's Republic
