= First Moscow State Medical University =

Medical university in Russia

I.M. Sechenov First Moscow State Medical University
- Первый Московский государственный медицинский университет имени И. М. Сеченова
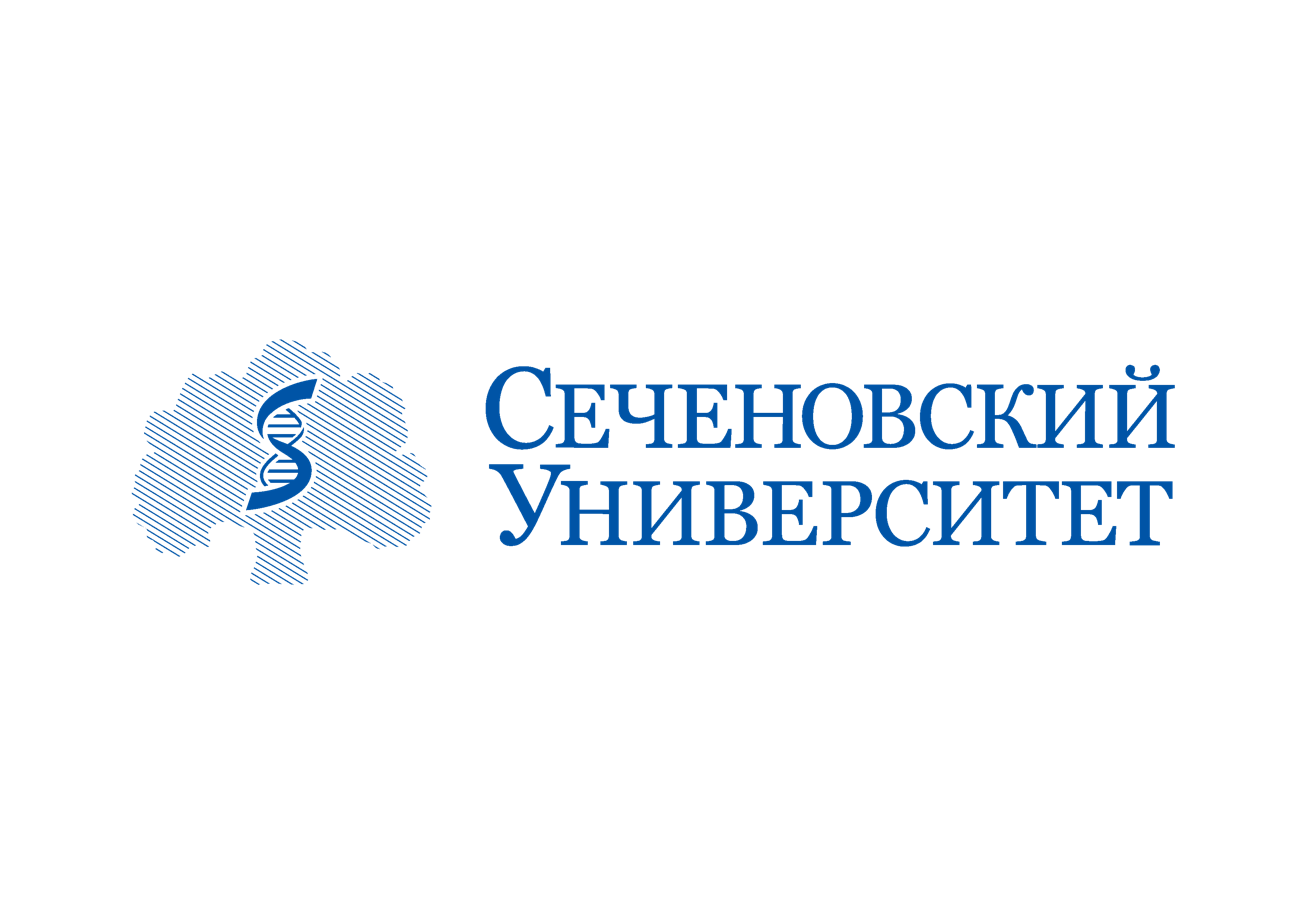
- Motto: Primus inter pares
- Type: Public
- Established: 1758
- Affiliations: Ministry of Health of the Russian Federation
- Rector: Petr Vitalevich Glybochko
- Location: Moscow, Russia; 55°43′41″N 37°34′30″E
- Campus: Urban
- Website: sechenov.ru
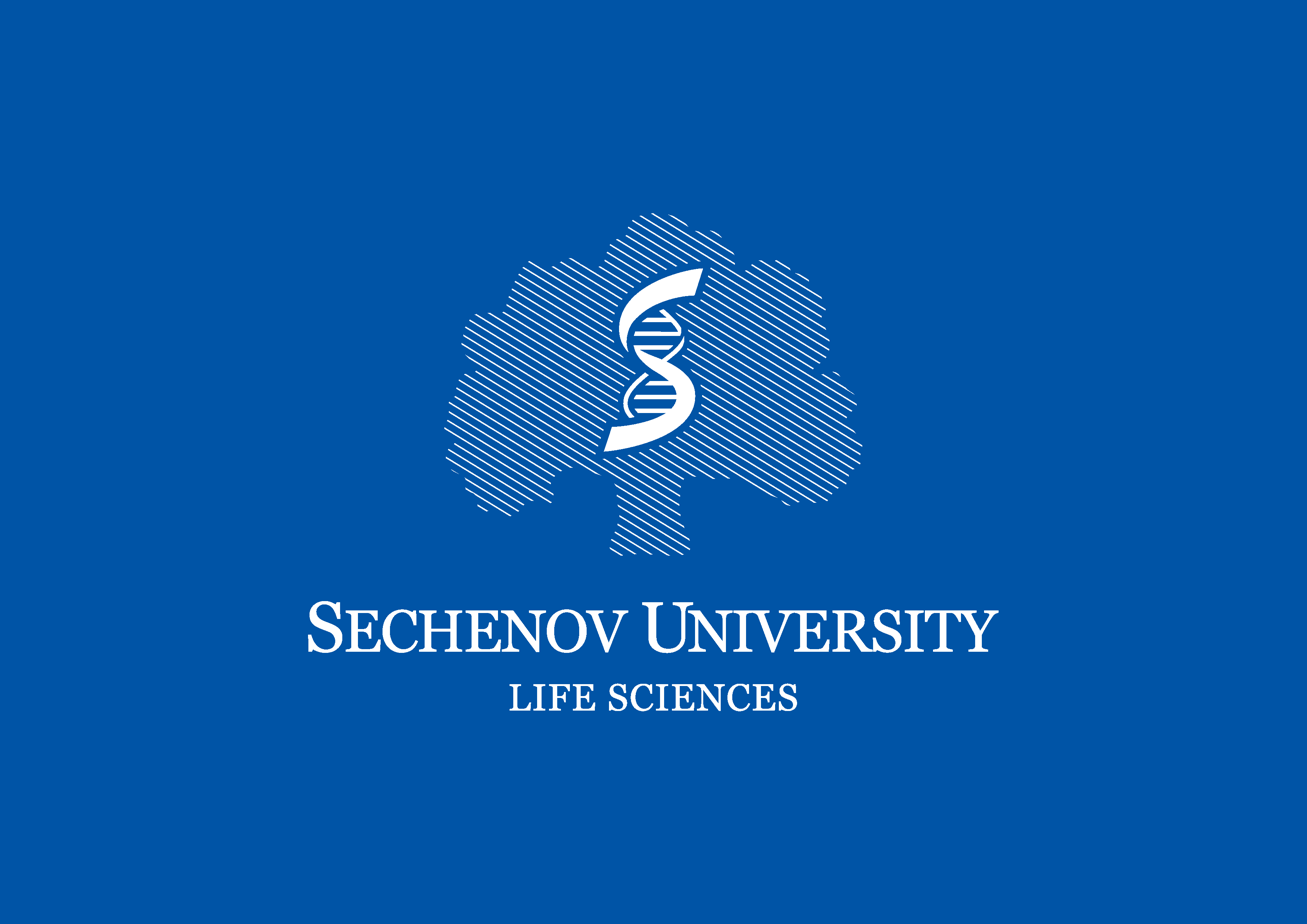
- Building details
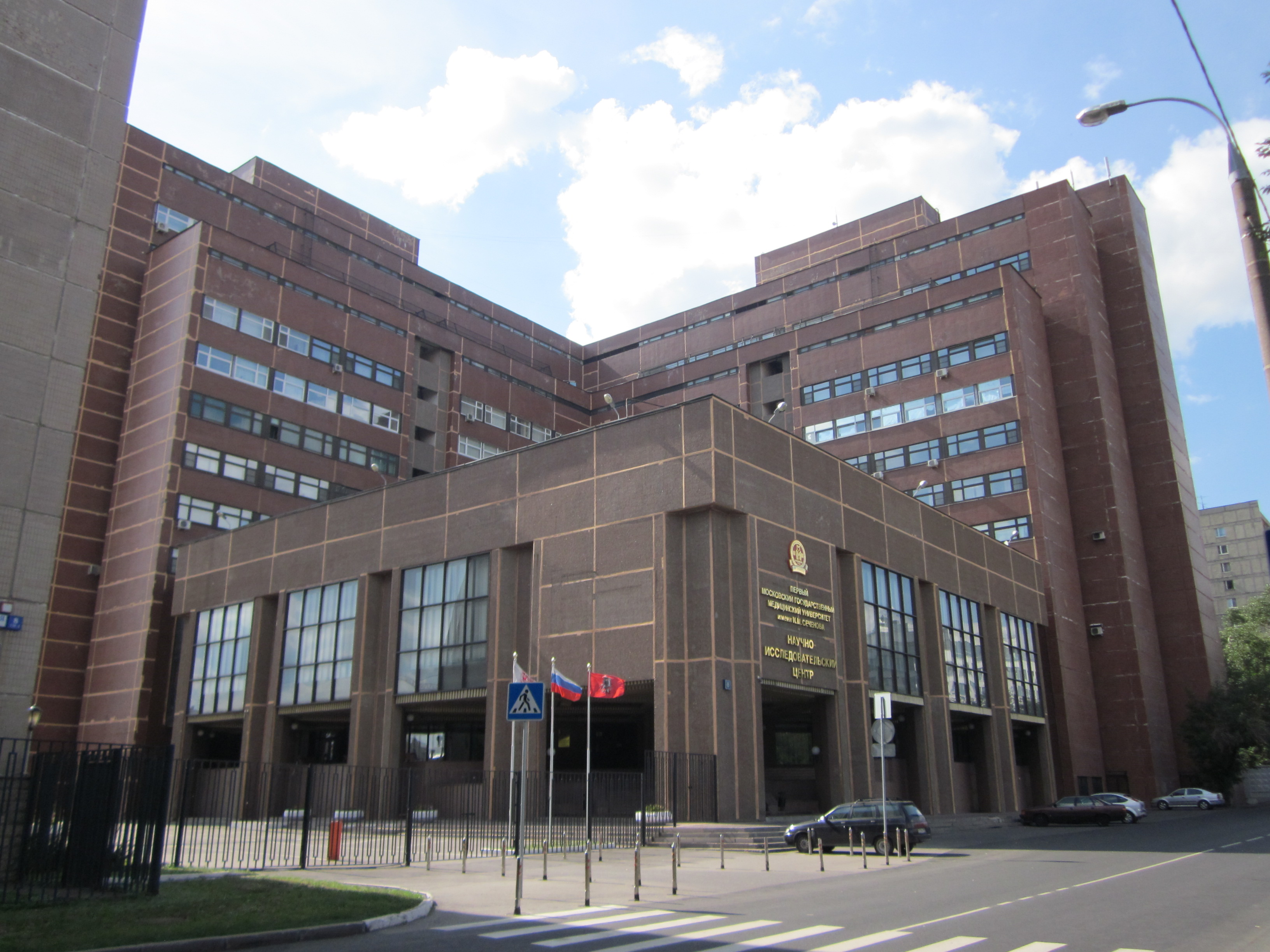
- First Moscow State Medical University, 2011

The I.M. Sechenov First Moscow State Medical University, also known as Sechenov University, is a public medical university in Moscow, Russia. The predecessor of the university was the Medical School of Moscow State University, which was founded in 1758 and was the first medical school in Russia. The university's medical ranking has long been ranked first in Russia and Eastern Europe.

Moscow State Medical University was founded hundreds of years ago and has been called the "First Medical Center" by Russians. It is a leading medical center in Russia and even in the world， most of the Russian medical scientists graduated from the First Moscow State Medical University (Sechenov University). I.M. Sechenov First Moscow State Medical University cooperates with world-class universities such as Johns Hopkins University, Duke University, University of Texas MD Anderson Cancer Center, University of Cambridge, Technical University of Munich, Hannover Medical School, Charité – Berlin University Medicine, Medical University of Vienna, University of Gothenburg, Erasmus University, and Peking Union Medical College.

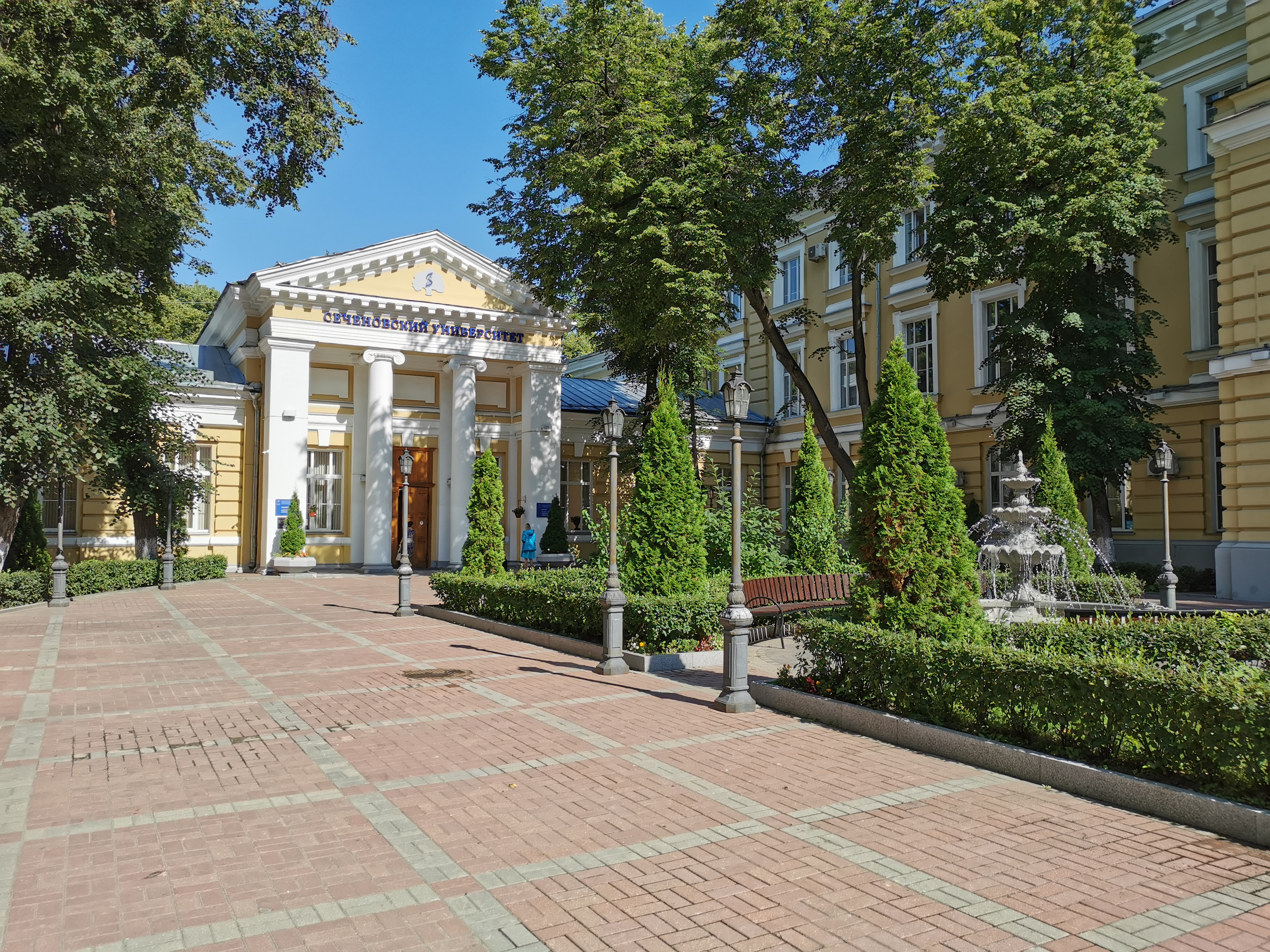
Sechenov First Moscow State Medical University

The university now has 20 affiliated hospitals, 10 Russian National Medical Research Centers, 32 laboratories and institutes, the Russian National Medical Library, 2,079 professors, 78 members of the Russian Academy of Sciences, and 10 members of the American Academy of Sciences.The entrance exam of the First Moscow State Medical University (Sechenov University) is extremely strict, with an admission rate of only 2.7% and a graduation rate of only 57.1%. Its academic qualifications are recognized by developed regions such as the United States and Europe.

In 2020, First Moscow State Medical University (Sechenov University) successfully completes trials of world's first COVID-19 vaccine. The school's medical school ranks 51st in the world。

== History ==
In 1755, Moscow State University was officially established and held an opening ceremony.

In 1758, Queen Elizabeth of Russia officially ordered the establishment of the Medical College of Moscow University, which was the first medical college in Russia and is also considered the beginning of the First Moscow State Medical University of Sechenov.

On August 13, 1758, Johann Christian Kerstens, a professor of medicine from Germany, officially gave lectures.

In 1791, Moscow University obtained the right to confer doctoral degrees in medicine, becoming the first university in Russia to obtain the right to confer doctoral degrees in medicine.

In 1897, at the 12th International Physician Conference held in Moscow, participants from various countries highly praised the medical level of the Medical College of Moscow State University, and the world-renowned German pathologist R. Virchow also said: "Learn from the Russians!"

In 1917, after the October Revolution, the Moscow Imperial University was officially renamed the current Moscow State University, and the Medical College under the university was also renamed the Medical College of Moscow State University.

In 1930, the Soviet Union reformed higher education, and the Medical School of Moscow State University was completely independent and became a research-oriented medical university -First Moscow State Medical School.

In 1953, Academician Herzen founded the largest clinical surgical hospital in the history of Russian surgery - the surgical hospital directly under the First Moscow State Medical School.

In 1955, the independent First Moscow State Medical School was officially named Sechenov in memory of Academician Ivan Mikhailovich Sechenov, the "Father of Russian Physiology".

University rankings

With the direct participation of professors of First Moscow State Medical School, the Soviet Academy of Medical Sciences (now the Russian Academy of Medical Sciences) was established in December 1944. The first president was N.N. Burdenko (Head of the Department of Surgery of First Moscow State Medical School), and other professors of First Moscow State Medical School served as vice presidents and other positions.

During the Soviet period, First Moscow State Medical School was already the oldest and largest medical center in Russia.

In 2010, the school was officially renamed I.M. Sechenov First Moscow State Medical University.

== Clinical Center and Research Center ==
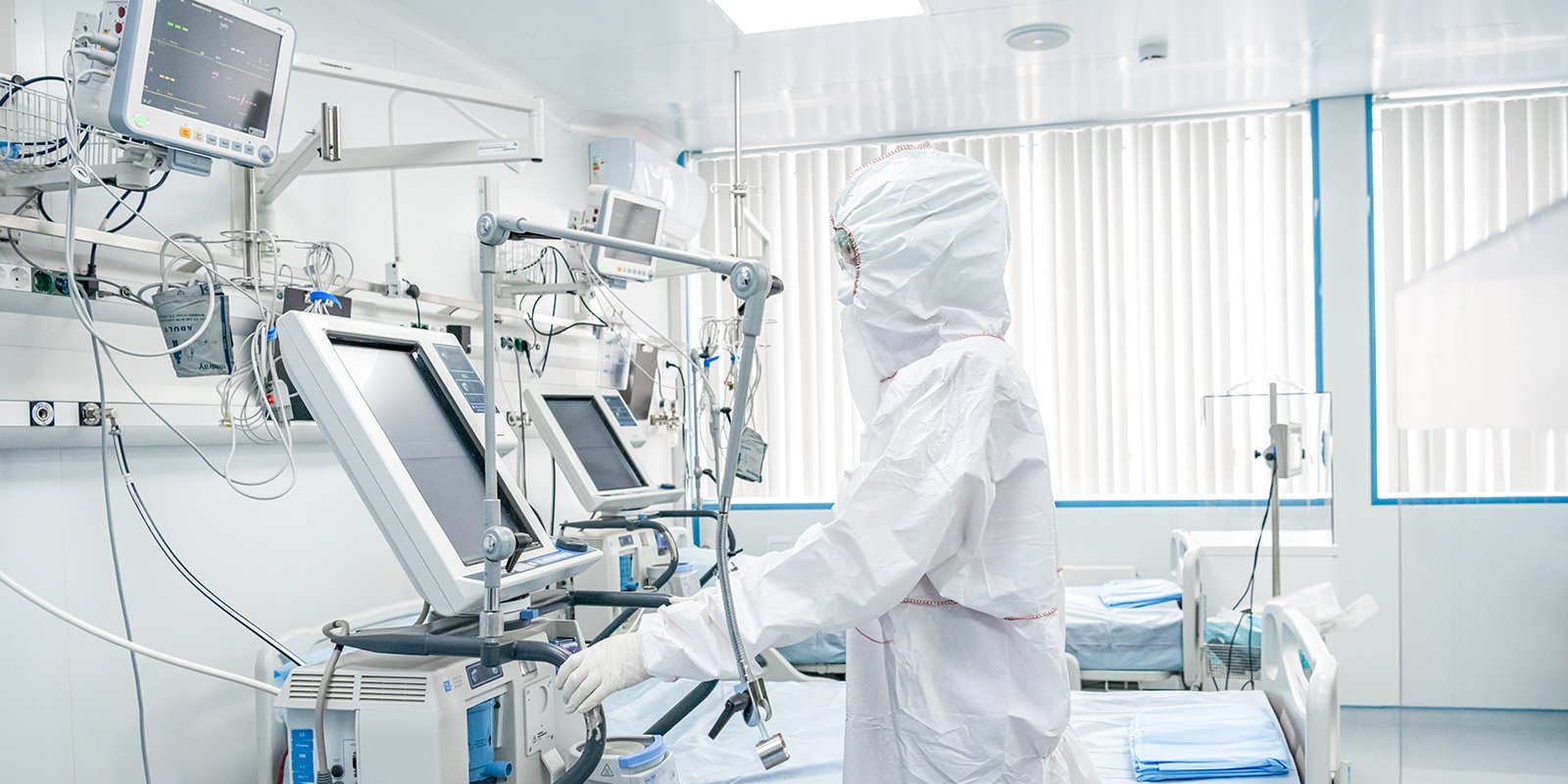
Sechenov First Moscow State Medical University (formerly Moscow State University Medical School)

The Clinical Center of I.M. Sechenov First Moscow State Medical University was founded in 1897. It is the highest national medical center in Russia and one of the largest clinical centers in Europe. Its multidisciplinary medical level ranks first in Russia and Eastern Europe and among the best in the world. The Clinical Center of I.M. Sechenov University includes 20 large affiliated hospitals, 10 university specialty clinics, and 197 medical practice bases.

As of 2024, the Clinical Center of Sechenov University has a total of 8,180 employees, most of whom have a doctorate in medicine. It has more than 500,000 inpatients and outpatients each year, and provides medical services in more than 40 specialties. More than 50% of surgical operations are high-tech, including the extensive use of Da Vinci surgical robot technology. It has clinical teaching experience, providing clinical internship opportunities for medical students of the school and cultivating high-level clinical medical talents.

As of 2023, the school has a total of more than 2,000 medical experts, 543 professors, many Nobel Prize winners, 10 members of the American Academy of Sciences, 47 members of the Russian Academy of Sciences, more than 70 honorary scientists of the Russian Federation, and more than 100 winners of the Russian National Award, Presidential Award and Government Award.

The main goal of Sechenov University's digital transformation policy by 2030 is the comprehensive transformation of education, research and clinical processes, and the transformation to a world-class research-based medical university model.

The international scientific research volume of the Research Center of I.M. Sechenov University is in the leading position among medical universities in the world. As of February 2024, the Research Center of I.M. Sechenov University has published 26,233 scientific papers and received 205,818 citations. The research covers a range of fields, including medicine, biology, chemistry, pathology, genetics, biochemistry, psychology, surgery, computer science and engineering.

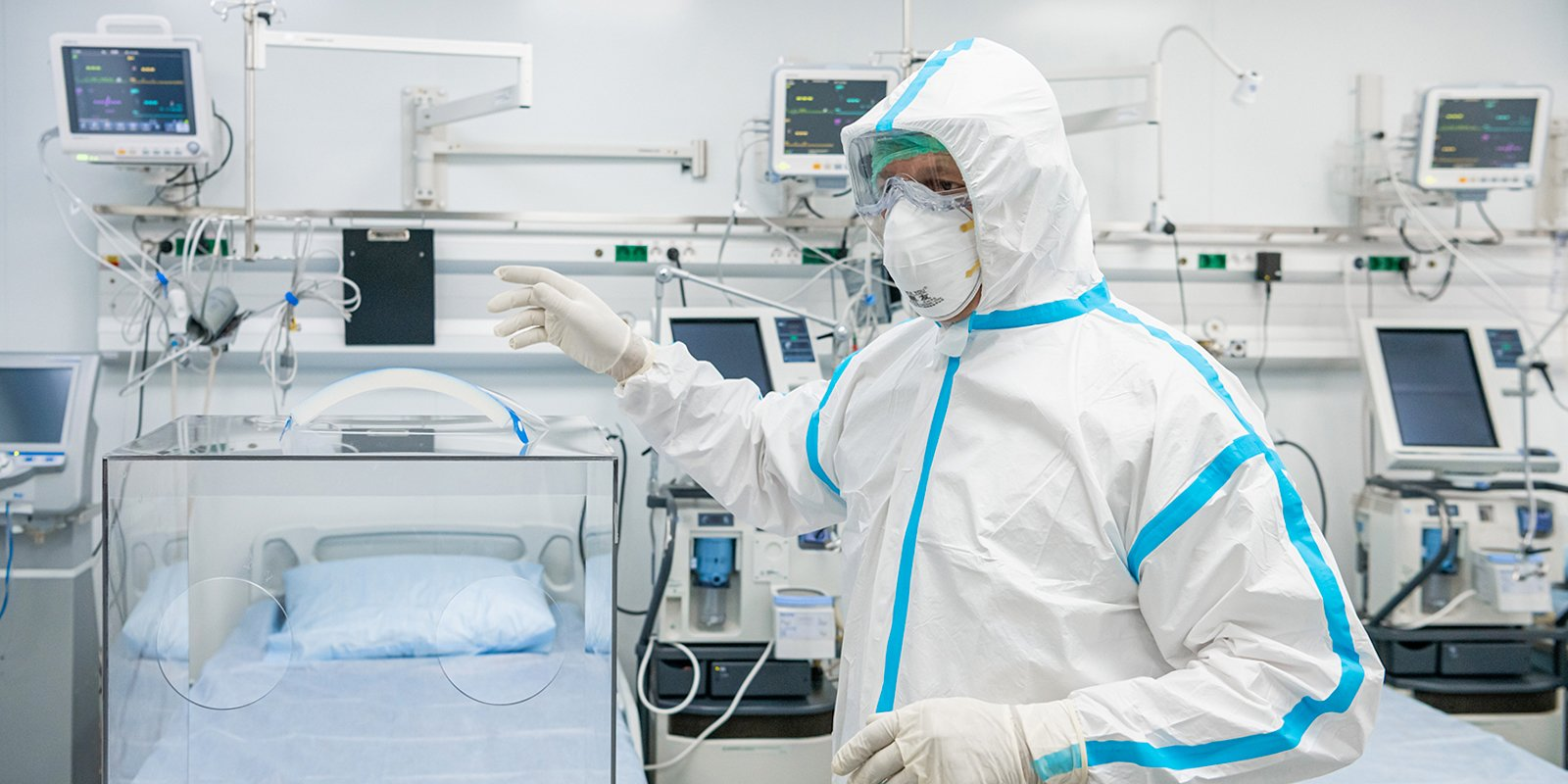
Sechenov First Moscow State Medical University (formerly Moscow State University Medical School)

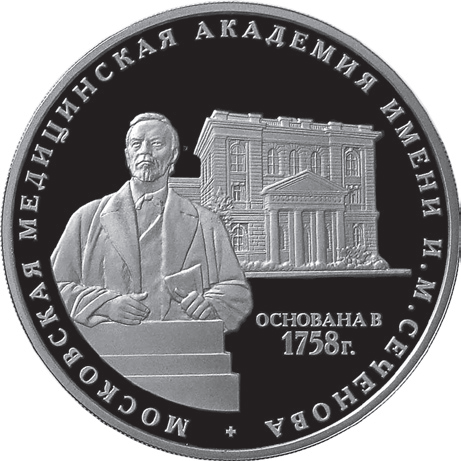
Coin of the Bank of Russia (silver, 3 rubles, reverse), series "Science", 250th anniversary of the Moscow Sechenov Medical Academy. Monument to Ivan Sechenov on Bolshaya Pirogovskaya Street in Moscow

== Faculties ==
- Faculty of Medicine
- Faculty of Pharmacy
- Faculty of Pediatrics
- Faculty of Preventive Medicine
- Faculty of Dentistry
- Faculty of Postgraduate Professional Training of Physicians
- Preparatory Department for International Applicants
- Institute of Professional Education
- Center of Master's Programs

== Notable alumni ==
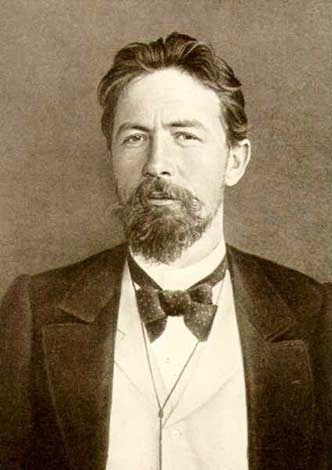
Anton Chekhov

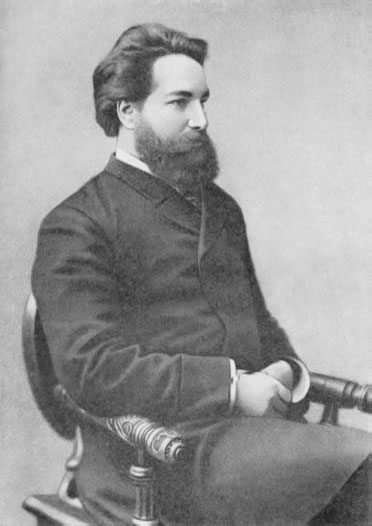
Sergei Korsakoff

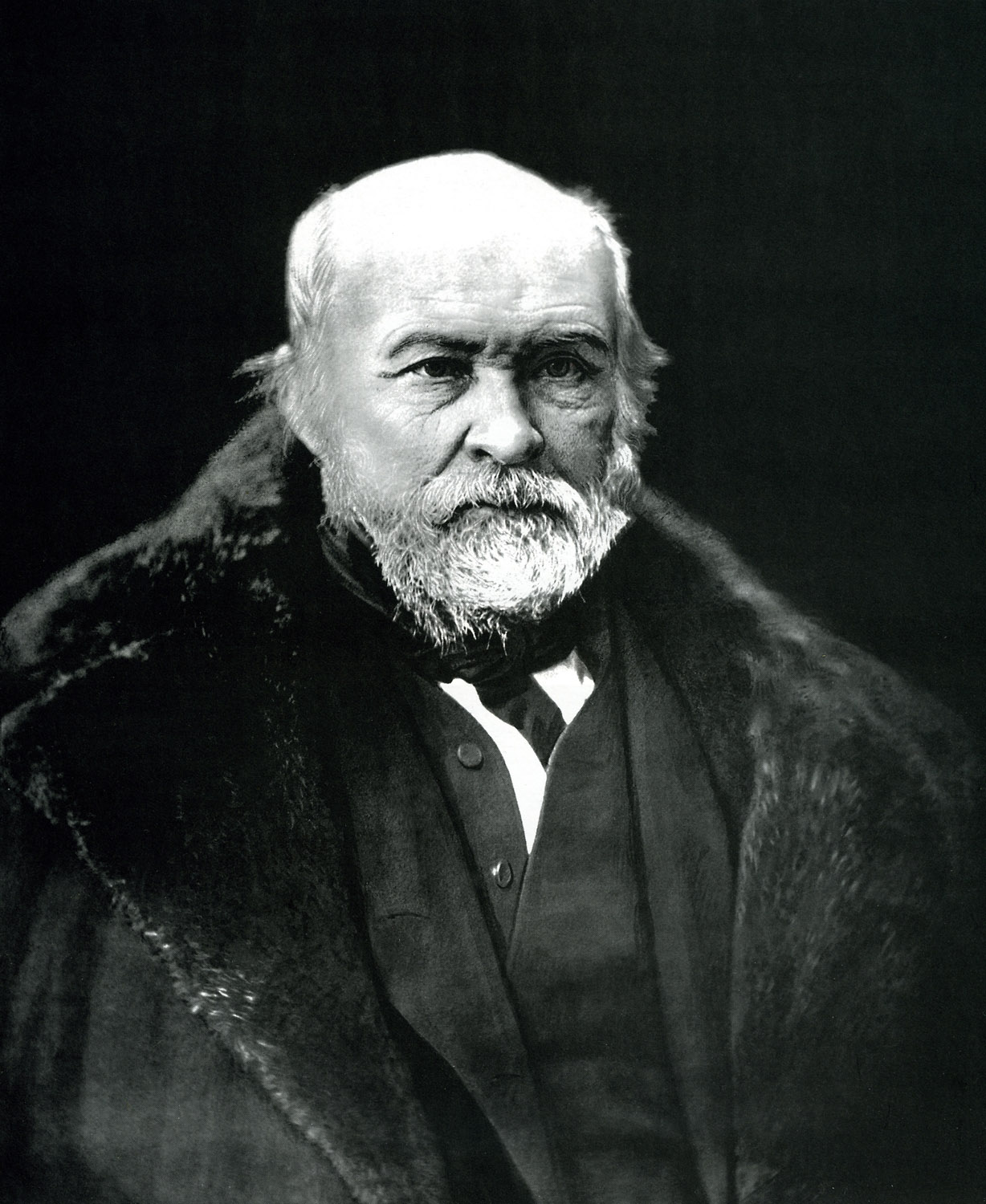
Nikolay Pirogov

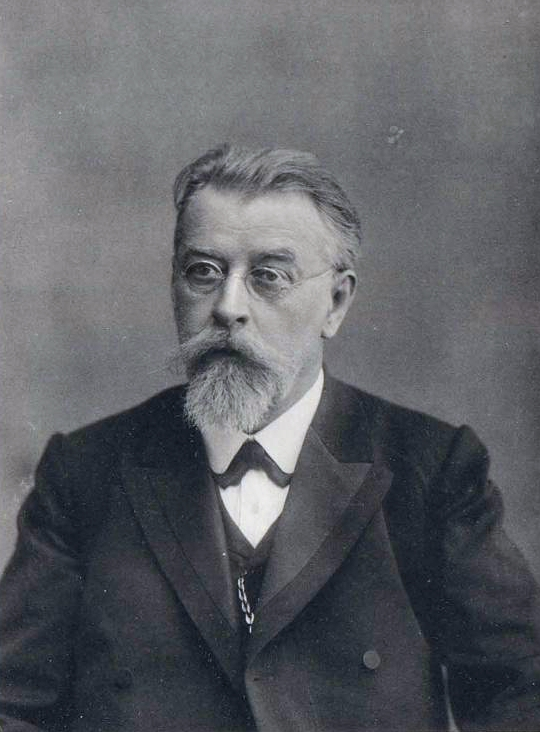
Vladimir Serbsky

As of 2023, the First Moscow State Medical University (Setonov University) has trained 3 astronauts, 1 vice president, 103 academicians of the Russian Academy of Sciences, more than 30 founders of various branches of medicine in Russia and even the world, more than 2,000 medical experts, many Nobel Prize honorary professors, 10 members of the American Academy of Sciences, more than 70 honorary scientists of the Russian Federation, more than 100 winners of the Russian State Award, the Presidential Award and the Government Award, etc.

As the strongest medical school in Russia, the founders of various disciplines in the Russian medical field basically graduated from here, such as Nikolai Sklifosovsky, the founder of Russian surgery, Neil Filatov, the founder of Russian pediatrics, Vladimir Snegiriev, the founder of Russian gynecology, Pirogov, the founder of Russian anatomy, Ivan Sechenov, the founder of Russian physiology, Valery Shumakov, the founder of Russian organ transplantation, Dmitry Dmitrievich Pletnev, the founder of Russian cardiology, Alexei Kozhevnikov, the founder of Russian neurology, and Burdenko Nikolai Nilovich, the founder of Russian neurosurgery. The founder of Russian orthopedics, Baum Georgy Sergeyevich; the founder of Russian sports traumatology, Zoya Mironova; the founder of Russian oncology, Peter Alexandrovich; the founder of Russian plastic surgery, Milanov Nikolay Olegovich; the founder of Russian dentistry, Yevdokimov Alexander Ivanovich; the founder of Russian ophthalmology, Filatov Vladimir Petrovich; the founder of Russian hematology, Andrei Ivanovich Vorobyev, etc.

- Alexei Ivanovich Abrikosov — pathologist and a member of the Soviet Academy of Sciences
- Arkady Arkanov - writer, doctor, playwright and stand-up comedian
- Oleg Atkov — cardiologist and astronaut
- Evgeni Babsky — physiologist and member of the Ukrainian Academy of Sciences
- Jonas Basanavičius — Lithuanian physician, activist and proponent of the Lithuanian National Revival
- Leo Bokeria — cardiac surgeon; academician; recipient of Lenin Prize, USSR State Prize and Russian State Prize
- Sergey Botkin — clinician, therapist, activist and one of the founders of modern Russian medical science and education
- Anton Chekhov — physician, playwright, and short-story writer
- Mikhail Chumakov — microbiologist and virologist; helped develop the Polio vaccine and organise its mass production
- Mikhail Davydov — medical scientist, oncologist, surgeon; president of Russian Academy of Medical Sciences; recipient of State Prize in Science and Technology
- Grigori Gorin (Grigori Israilevich Ofshtein) - playwright and writer
- Sergei Korsakoff — neuropsychiatrist of the 19th century, known for his studies on the effects of alcoholism on the nervous system (Korsakoff syndrome) and introduction of the concept of paranoia
- Anatoly Kudryavitsky — Russian-Irish novelist and poet
- Shabsay Moshkovsky — physician, infectious disease specialist, epidemiologist
- Alexander Podrabinek - dissident, journalist, and commentator
- Vladimir Serbsky — psychiatrist and one of the founders of forensic psychiatry in Russia; center of forensic psychiatry, Serbsky Center, was named after him
- Pyotr Gannushkin — psychiatrist that developed one of the first theories of psychopathies (today known as personality disorders)
- Nikolay Pirogov — scientist, medical doctor, inventor, pedagogue and member of the Russian Academy of Sciences; considered to be the founder of field surgery and was one of the first surgeons in Europe to use ether as an anaesthetic
- Ivan Sechenov — neurophysiologist; Moscow Medical Academy and Institute of Evolutionary Physiology and Biochemistry were named after him
- Nikolay Sklifosovsky — surgeon, scientist and teacher
- Maxim Konchalovsky — clinician; figure in Russian internal medicine during first half of the 20th century
- Alexander Myasnikov — physician, cardiologist, academician of the USSR Academy of Medical Sciences
- Dimitri Venediktov — Deputy Health Minister of the USSR
- Valentin Pokrovsky — epidemiologist; president of Russian Academy of Medical Sciences and director of the Central Research Institute of Epidemiology
- Galina Serdyukovskaya — hygienist, academic and politician
- Valery Shumakov — surgeon and transplantologist; a pioneer of artificial organ surgery; recipient of Russian state's Order of Saint Andrew
- Renat Akchurin — cardiac surgeon; academician
- Rafiq Tağı — Azerbaijani short-story writer and journalist, graduated in cardiology
- Amiran Revishvili — Georgian cardiac surgeon and electrophysiologist, president of Pan-Russian Scientific Society of Clinical Electrophysiology, Arrhythmology and Cardiac Pacing
- Boris Yegorov — physician-astronaut who became the first physician to make a space flight
