= Maxim Konchalovsky =

Russian physician (1875–1942)

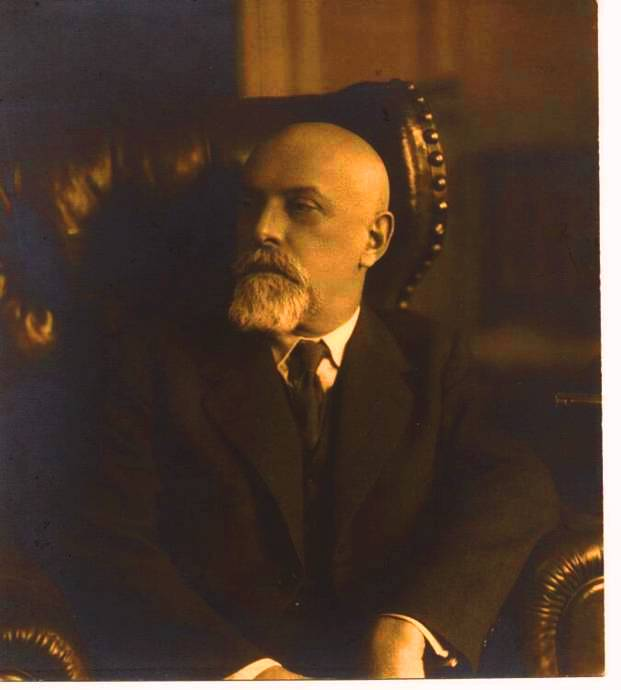
Konchalovsky in the 1930s

Maxim Petrovich Konchalovsky (Russian: Максим Петрович Кoнчалoвский; 13 October [O.S. 1 October] 1875, Odessa – November 29, 1942, Moscow) was a Russian and Soviet doctor, close clinician, founder of the school of internal medicine clinic.

The elder brother of the artist Pyotr Konchalovsky.
