= Shabsay Moshkovsky =

Soviet epidemiologist (1895–1982)

Shabsay Davidovich Moshkovsky (1895—1982; Russian: Шабсай Давидович Мошковский) was a Soviet physician, infectious disease scientist and epidemiologist with a particular interest in malaria.

== Biography ==
Moshkovsky was born on July 23, 1895, in Pinsk in the Minsk Governorate. His father was Dovid-Behr Iosifovich Moshkovsky, a teacher in a Jewish elementary school, who was shot amongst a group of 35 hostages on March 5, 1919. He had four brothers including Yakov Moshkovsky, a military and polar pilot, and Mikhail Moshkovsky, who also became a scientist, and was an academician of the Russian Academy of Medical Sciences and one of the founders of Russian pharmacology.

Moshkovsky graduated from the Medical Faculty of Moscow State University in 1919 and was then drafted into the Red Army, where he served from 1919 to 1920.

Moshkovsky began his scientific career in 1921 at the Moscow Tropical Institute. From 1934 he was at the Institute of Medical Parasitologists, becoming deputy director from 1935 and, head of the department of protozoology from 1936. (1936-1968). He organized the Department of Medical Parasitology of the Central Institute for Advanced Training of Physicians (CIUV) from 1935. He was a member of the Presidium of the Scientific Medical Council of the Ministry of Health of the USSR, a member of the epidemiological and pharmacological committees and a member of the editorial board of the journal "Medical Parasitology and parasitic diseases". He was a corresponding Member of the Academy of Medical Sciences of the USSR (1946), and a recognized expert of the World Health Organization.

He wrote more than 300 scientific works, including textbooks, manuals and monographs. Under his supervision, 10 doctoral and more than 30 candidate dissertations were performed.

During the 1950s, Moshkovsky published a series of papers on the epidemiology of malaria, introducing concepts such as the 'loimpotential' for the force of infection at a location and 'epidemetrons' for epidemiological change in a population. Although similar to the comparable work of his British contemporary George Macdonald, Moshkovsky's work had little influence on malaria epidemiology in the English-speaking world.

He died 20 August 1982 in Moscow.

== Awards ==
- He was awarded many orders and medals of the USSR, as well as the Bulgarian Order of Cyril and Methodius. His name is inscribed in the Book of Honor of the All-Union Society of Microbiologists, Epidemiologists and Infectious Disease Specialists.

== Major textbooks ==
- Аллергия и иммунитет [Allergies and immunity], 1947.
- Основные закономерности эпидемиологии малярии [Basic patterns of malaria epidemiology], 1950.

== Selected other works ==
- Е. И. Марциновский (1874—1934): Паразитолог и инфекционист. [E. I. Martsinovsky (1874-1934): Parasitologist and infectious disease specialist.]
- The dynamics of malaria eradication. World Health Organization, 1964
- Further contribution to the dynamics of malaria eradication. World Health Organization, 1966.

== Biography ==
- Корифеи отечественной медицинской паразитологии [Luminaries of Domestic Medical Parasitology].
