= Pyotr Konchalovsky =

Russian painter (1876–1956)

- Пётр Кончаловский
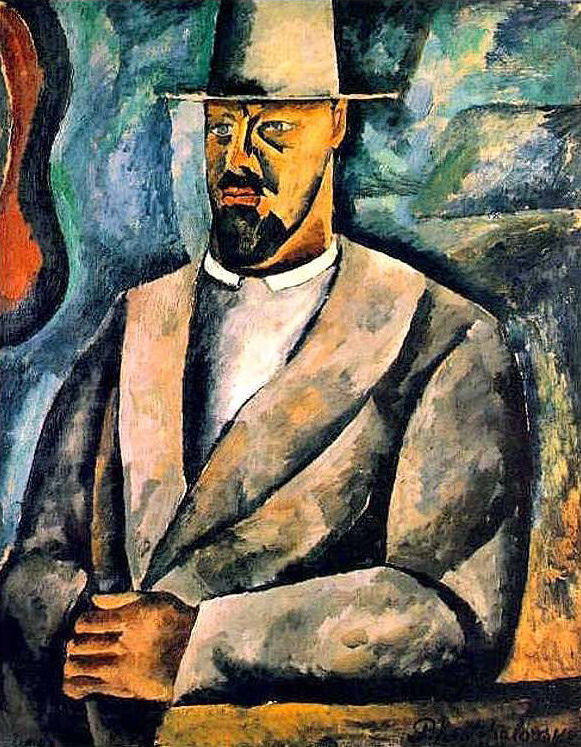
- Self-portait, 1912
- Born: Pyotr Petrovich Konchalovsky; 21 February [O.S. 9 February] 1876; Slavyansk, Kharkov Governorate, Russian Empire
- Died: 2 February 1956 (aged 79); Moscow, Russian SFSR, Soviet Union
- Resting place: Novodevichy Cemetery
- Education: Académie Julian; Imperial Academy of Arts, 1907
- Movement: Knave of Diamonds
- Spouse: Olga Surikova (m. 1902)
- Children: 2
- Relatives: Sergey Mikhalkov (son-in-law); Nikita Mikhalkov (grandson); Andrei Konchalovsky (grandson); Egor Konchalovsky (great-grandson)

Pyotr Petrovich Konchalovsky (Note: Also anglicised as Petr Petrovich Konchalovsky.) (Russian: Пётр Петрович Кончаловский; 21 February [O.S. 9 February] 1876 – 2 February 1956) was a Russian and Soviet painter. Konchalovsky was a founding member and chairman of the Knave of Diamonds group.

== Early life and education ==
Pyotr Konchalovsky was born on 21 February 1876 in the village of Slavyansk in Kharkov Governorate of the Russian Empire (present-day Ukraine). His father, Pyotr, was a translator and art publisher with connections to many artists active in Russia during the late 19th century. His brothers were Maxim, a physician, and Dmitry, a historian.

In 1889, the Konchalovsky family moved to Moscow and their house became a part of the Moscow art scene of the 1890s. Their house was often visited by Valentin Serov, Konstantin Korovin, Mikhail Vrubel, Vasily Surikov, and Konchalovsky used to spend every weekend at Tretyakov gallery to study the canvases painted by key Russian artists.

During his gymnasium years Konchalovsky attended classes of Moscow School of Painting, Sculpture and Architecture. After advice of Konstantin Korovin and Valentin Serov, in 1896–1898 he traveled to Paris to study at the Académie Julian under Jean-Joseph Benjamin-Constant and Jean-Paul Laurens. One of his classmates being Albert Gleizes. In 1899, he returned to Russia and entered the Imperial Academy of Arts in Saint Petersburg, graduating in 1907. At the academy, he studied under Vasily Savinsky, Hugo Salemann and Pavel Kovalevsky.

== Career ==
=== Breakout days in the Moscow avant-garde ===
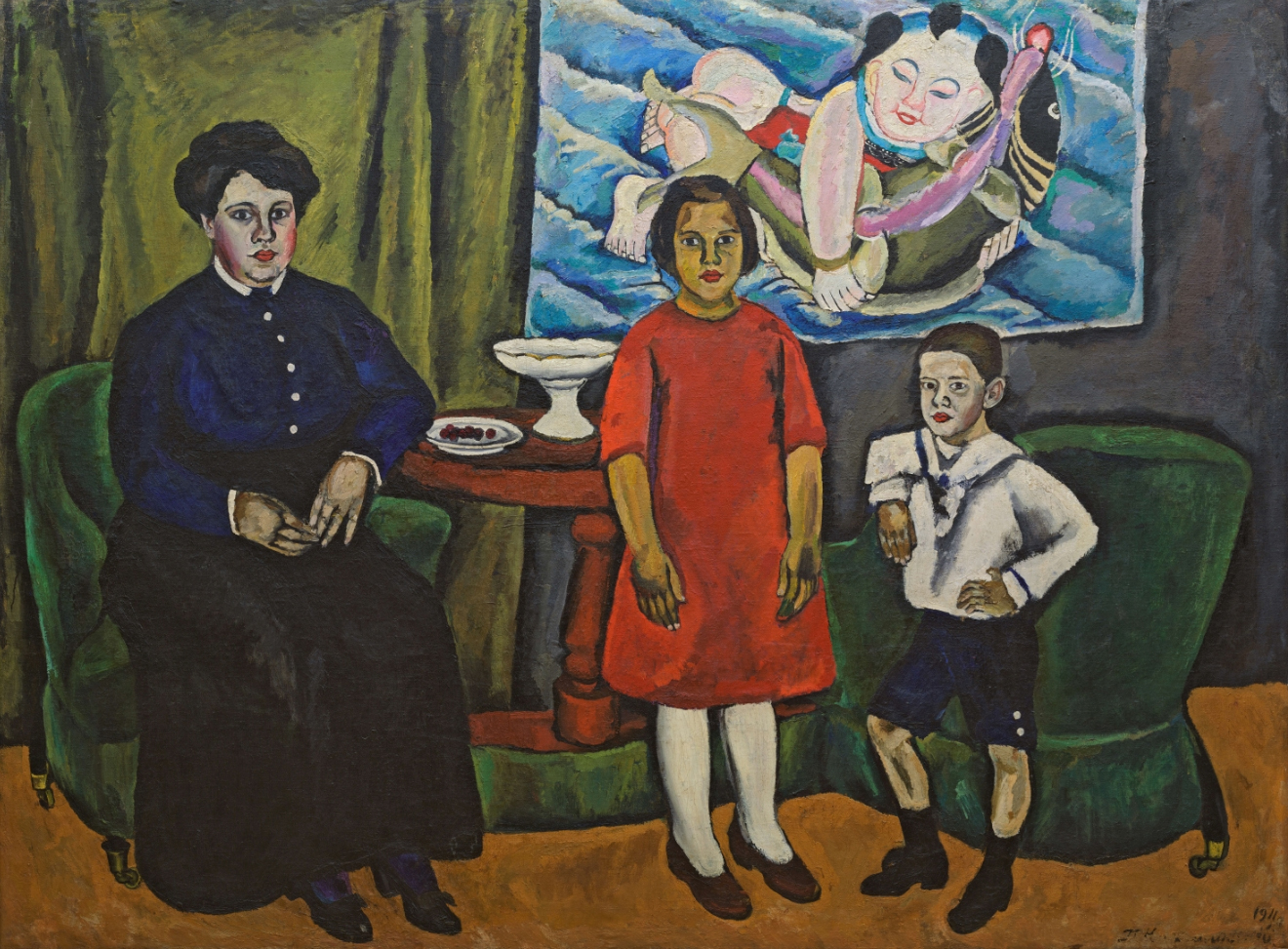
Portrait of the artist's family (1911)

In the book Pyotr Konchalovsky (1936) by V. Nikolsky, Konchalovsky recollects that he "found his art" when he visited Paris for the second time in 1907, and discovered Paul Cezanne and Vincent van Gogh. He even made a week-long trip to Arles, to "penetrate even deeper into van Gogh’s world and to learn his art to the bottom".

Working under these influences, he made a public debut at the Salon des Indépendants exhibition in Paris, 1908, but Konchalovsky soon returned to Moscow, bringing with him new ideas (elements of his work from this period have been identified as "Fauvist" and cezannism).

By 1909, he was exhibiting frequently, participating in the Golden Fleece, Fraternity, Mir iskusstva, and the New Society of Artists. He was a founding member of the Knave of Diamonds society in 1910, a rebellious, avante-garde group seeking to synthesize the modern art breakthroughs of French and German styles with Russian primitivism. Where Western European looked to African sculptures for artistic refreshment and inspiration, these Russian painters imagined they could turn to "indigenous" Russian works such as icons, provincial tavern and shop signs and street ads, “lubok”-style colorful book illustrations. Konchalovsky was elected as the group's first chairman in 1910.

=== Post WWI advancements ===
After serving in the Imperial Russian Army in 1914–1916, Konchalovsky returned to his art with moderated intentions. Beginning in 1918, he taught art. In 1922, he had his first solo exhibition at the Tretyakov Gallery.

During that period, he mostly drew still lifes and landscapes. His paintings—as of all other Jacks of Diamond—remained strongly influenced by Paul Cézanne. But he started to paint portraits (often ceremonial portraits) that are considered examples of socialist realism style.

== Personal life ==
In 1902, Konchalovsky married Olga Surikova (1878–1958), the daughter of painter Vasily Surikov. Konchalovsky and Surikova had two children, the painter Mikhail Petrovich Konchalovsky and the poet and children's writer Natalya Konchalovskaya.

Through his daughter, Konchalovsky was the father-in-law of Sergey Mikhalkov a notable poet, the author of children's poetry and two versions of the State Anthem of the Soviet Union and the present national anthem of Russia. They have two sons: Andrei Konchalovsky, a film writer, director and a painter (whose son Egor is also a notable film director) and Nikita Mikhalkov, also a movie director who, in 1994, won the Best Foreign Language Film Oscar for his film Burnt by the Sun.

== Works ==
Konchalovsky was a very prolific painter, and is known to have created more than five thousand works over the course of his long creative life. His work demonstrates a "complex evolution" of styles.

The influence of Paul Cezanne was "clearly visible" in Konchalovsky's paintings in the pre-WWI period.

Heralded as a member of Russia's avant-garde, following World War II he became a member of the USSR Academy of Fine Arts and a People's Artist of the RSFSR.

His paintings are considered to have made a significant contribution to "the development of Soviet realistic art."

== Legacy ==
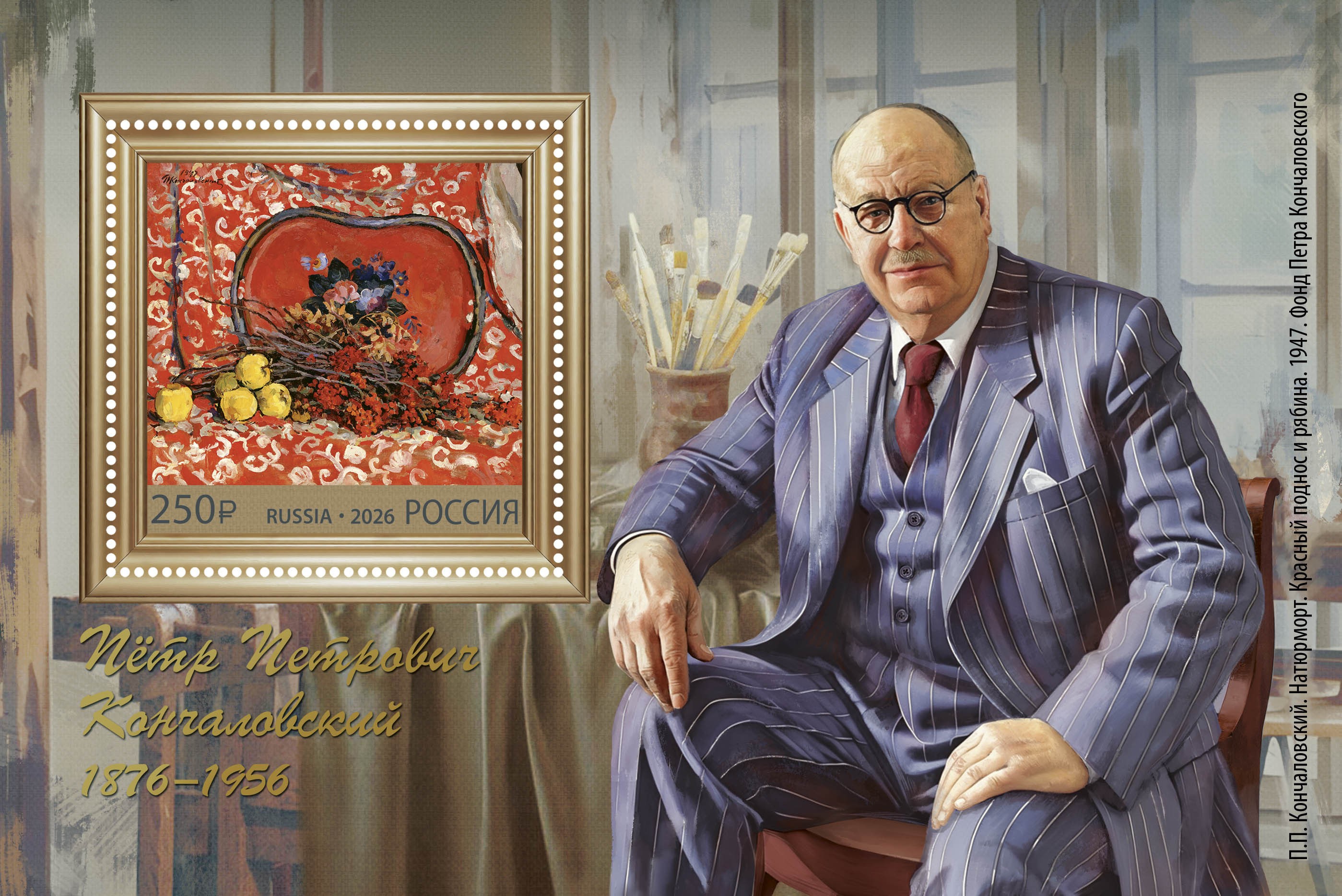
Konchalovsky and his 1947 work Still life. Red tray and rowan berries on a 2026 stamp sheet of Russia

In 2006, his heirs established the Petr Konchalovsky Foundation, a non-commercial beneficial organization created to consolidate Konchalovsky's legacy. In addition to organizing exhibitions and presentations of Konchalovsky's artworks, the foundation is dedicated to conservation and authentication of the artist's work.

A street in Moscow is named after the artist.

== Galleries ==
Pyotr Konchalovsky paintings, pre-WWI

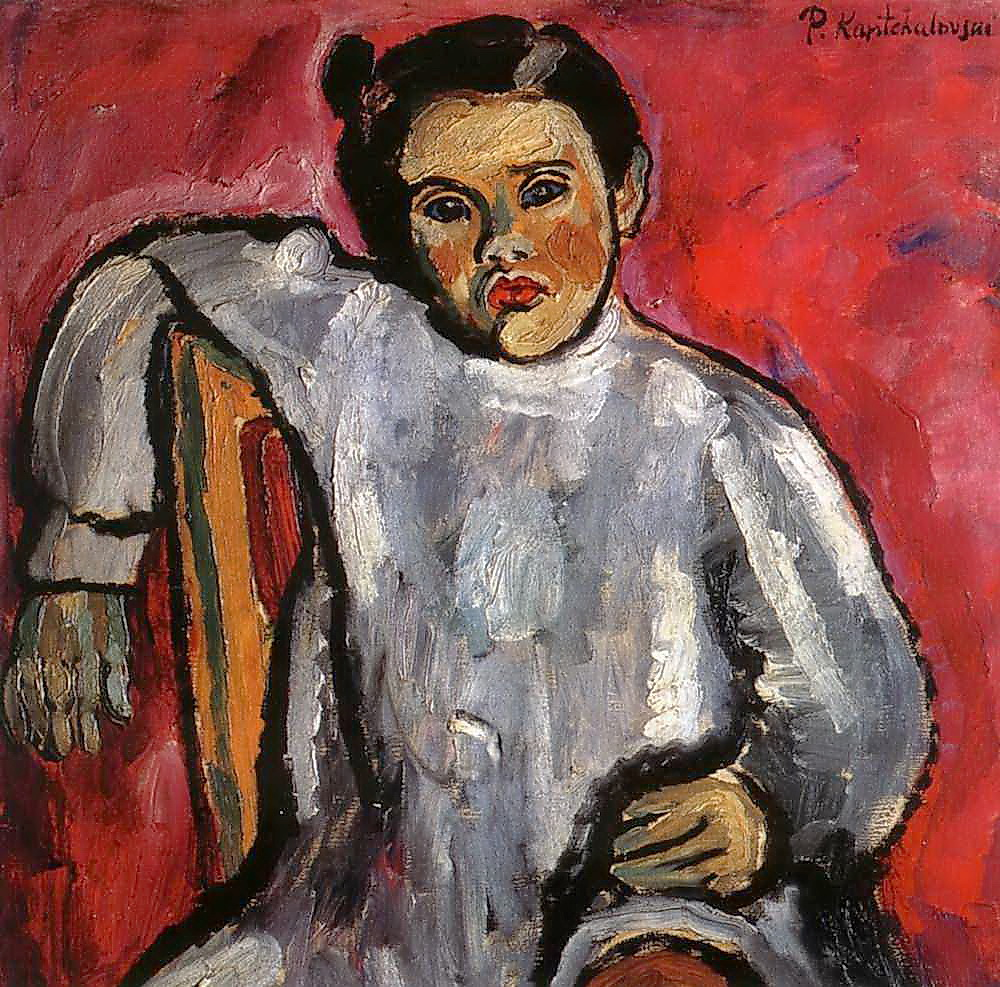
Natasha Konchalovskaya on a chair (1910) Pyotr Konchalovsky

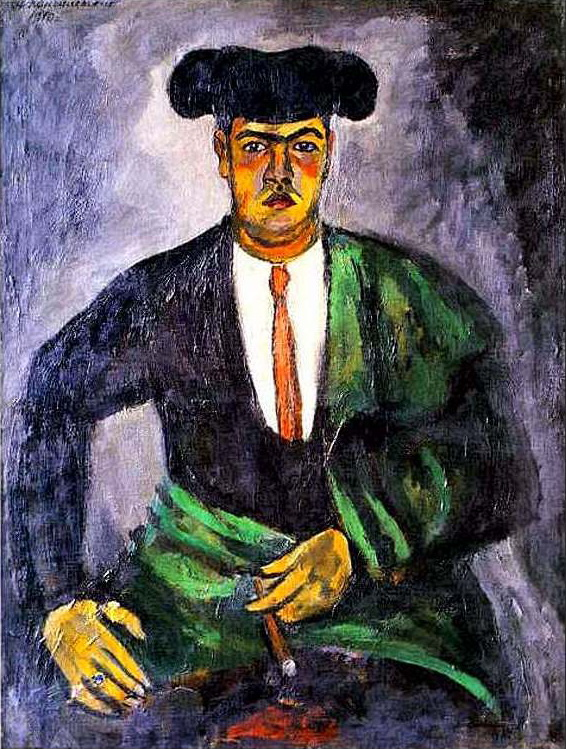
Matador Manuel Gartha (1910)

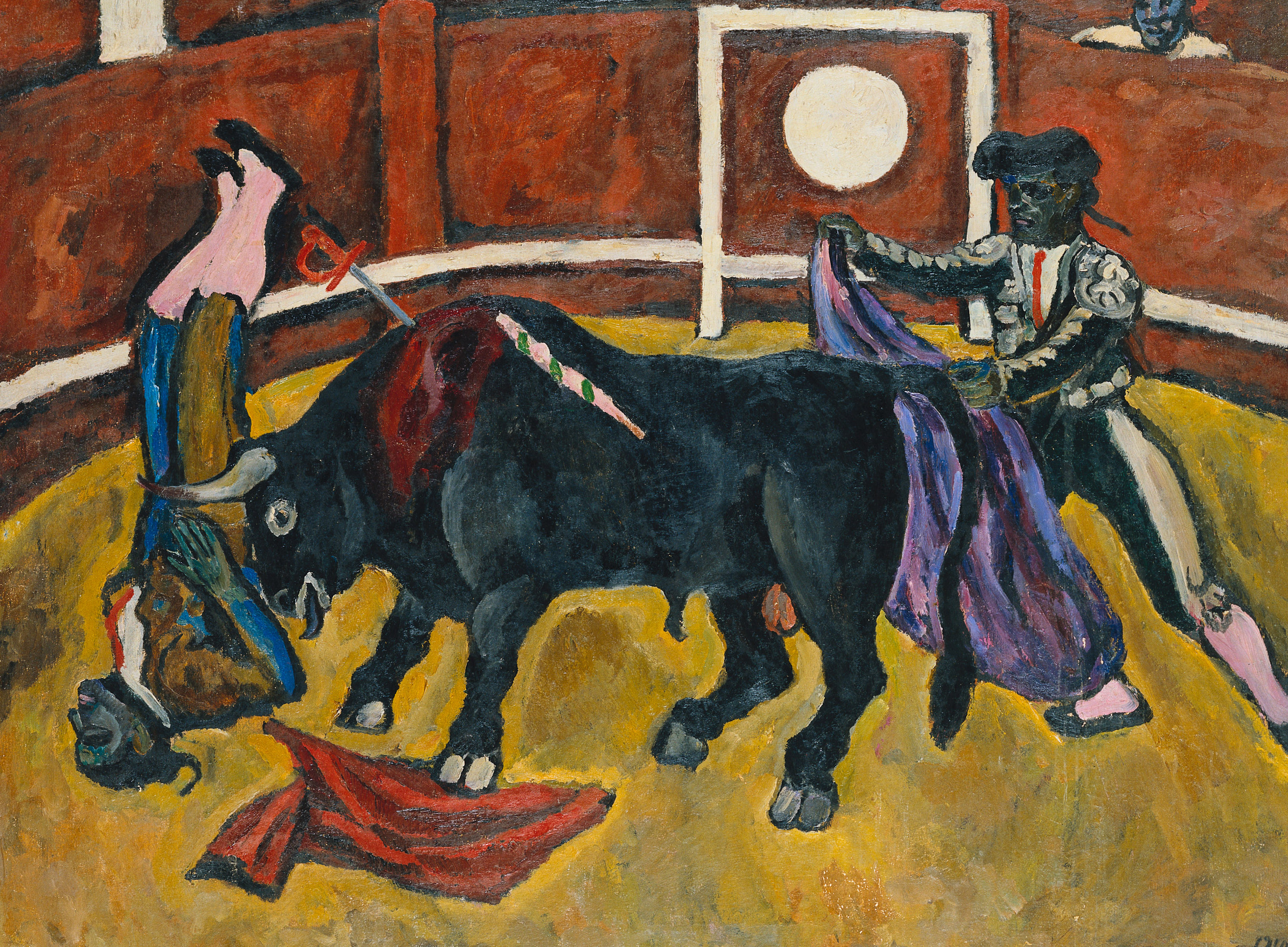
Bullfight (1910)

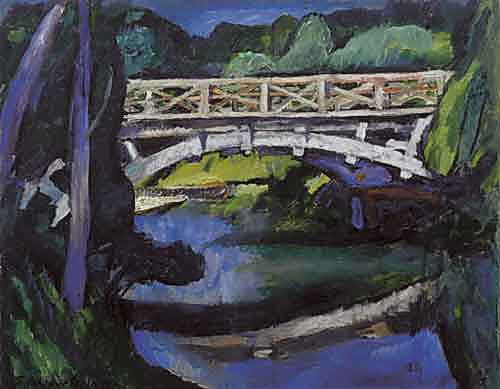
Bridge (1911)

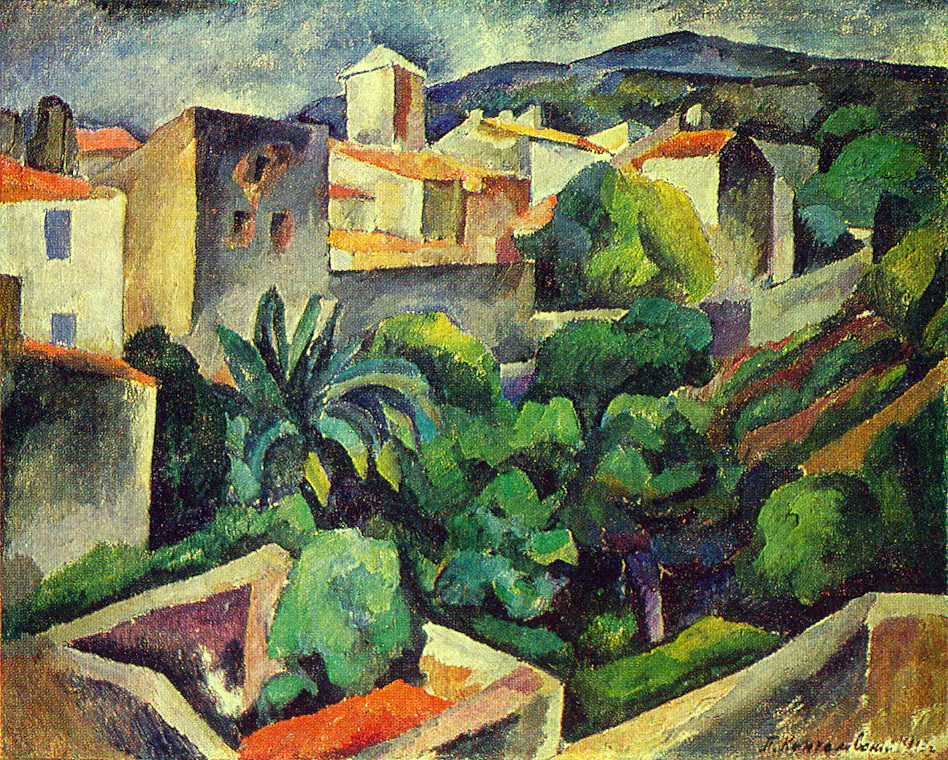
Cassis, the view from the window (1913)

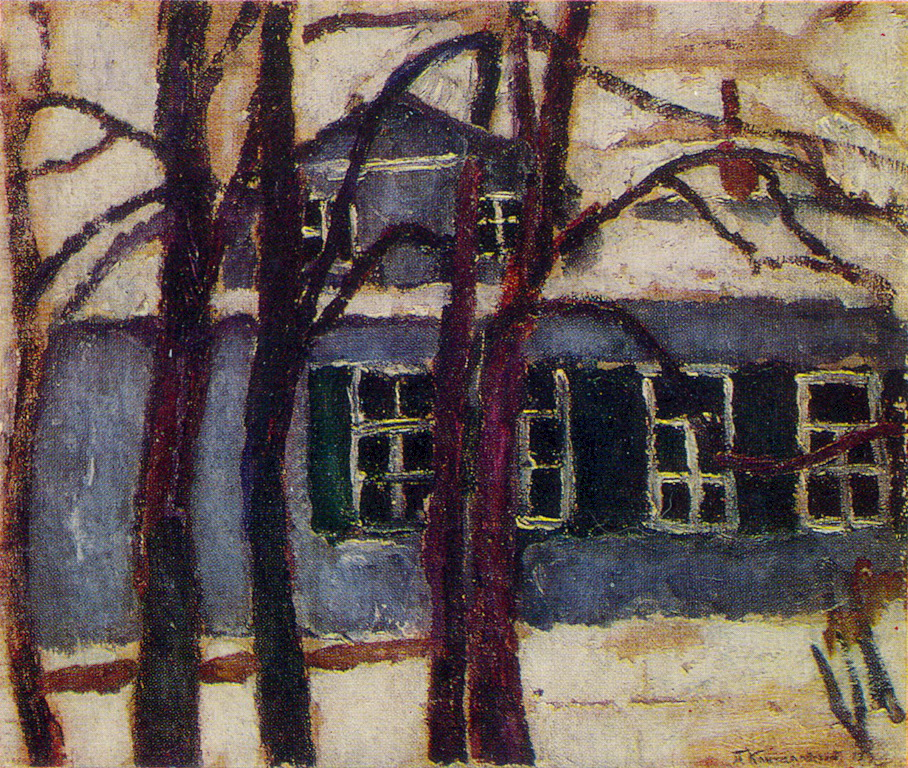
House in Abramtsevo (1911)

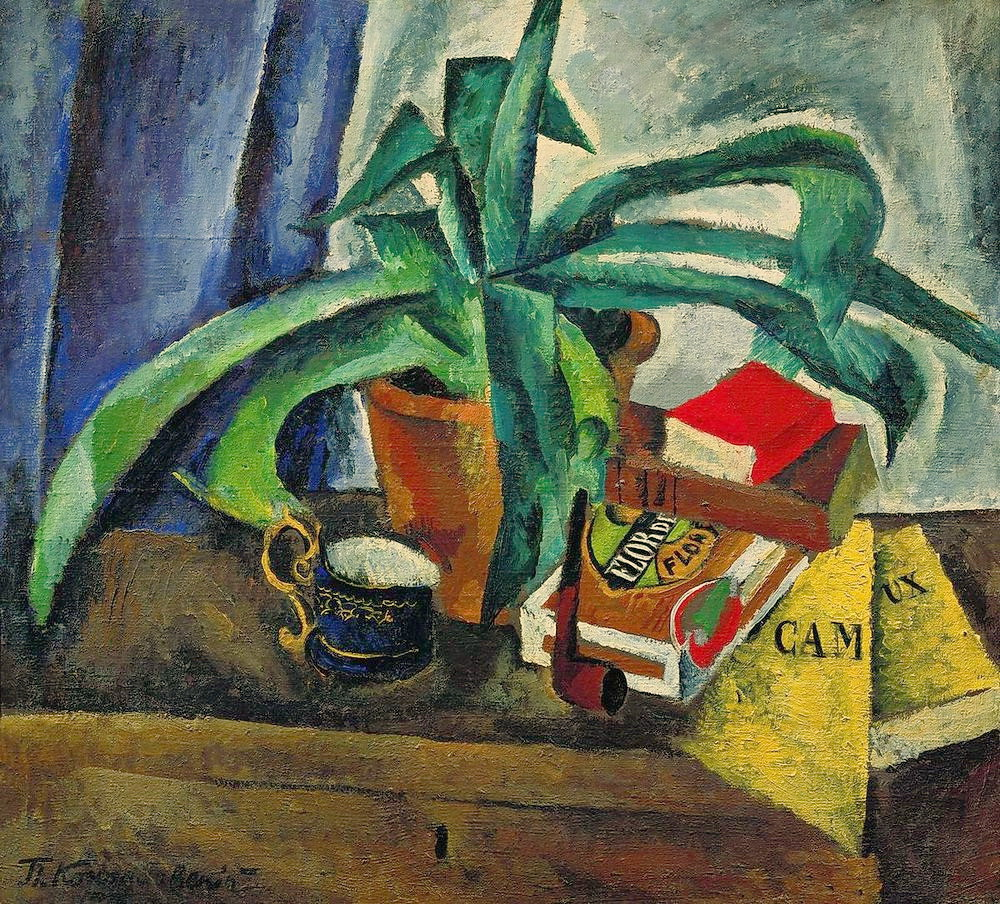
Agave (1916)
Pyotr Konchalovsky paintings, Soviet period

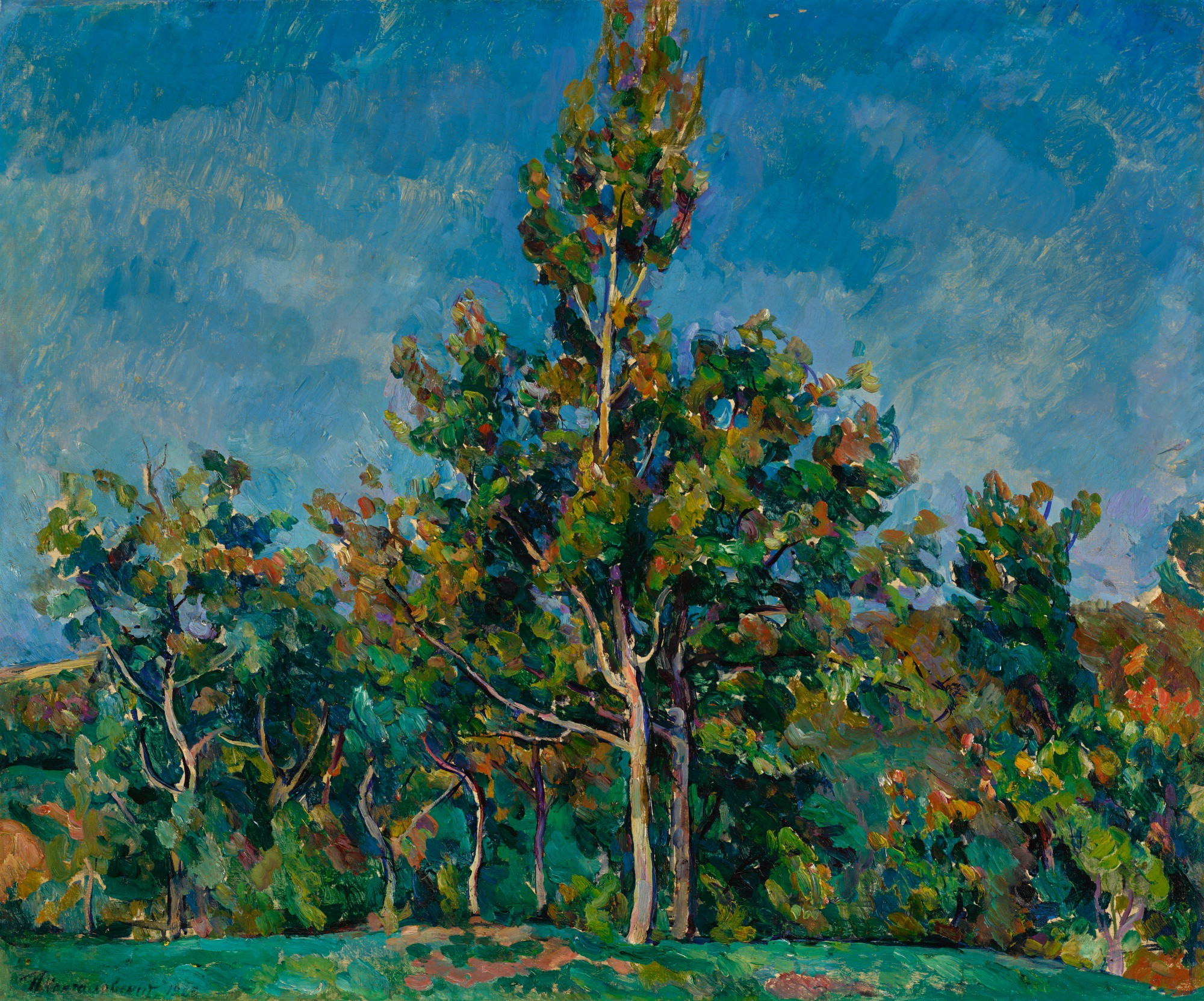
Tree against the sky (1923)

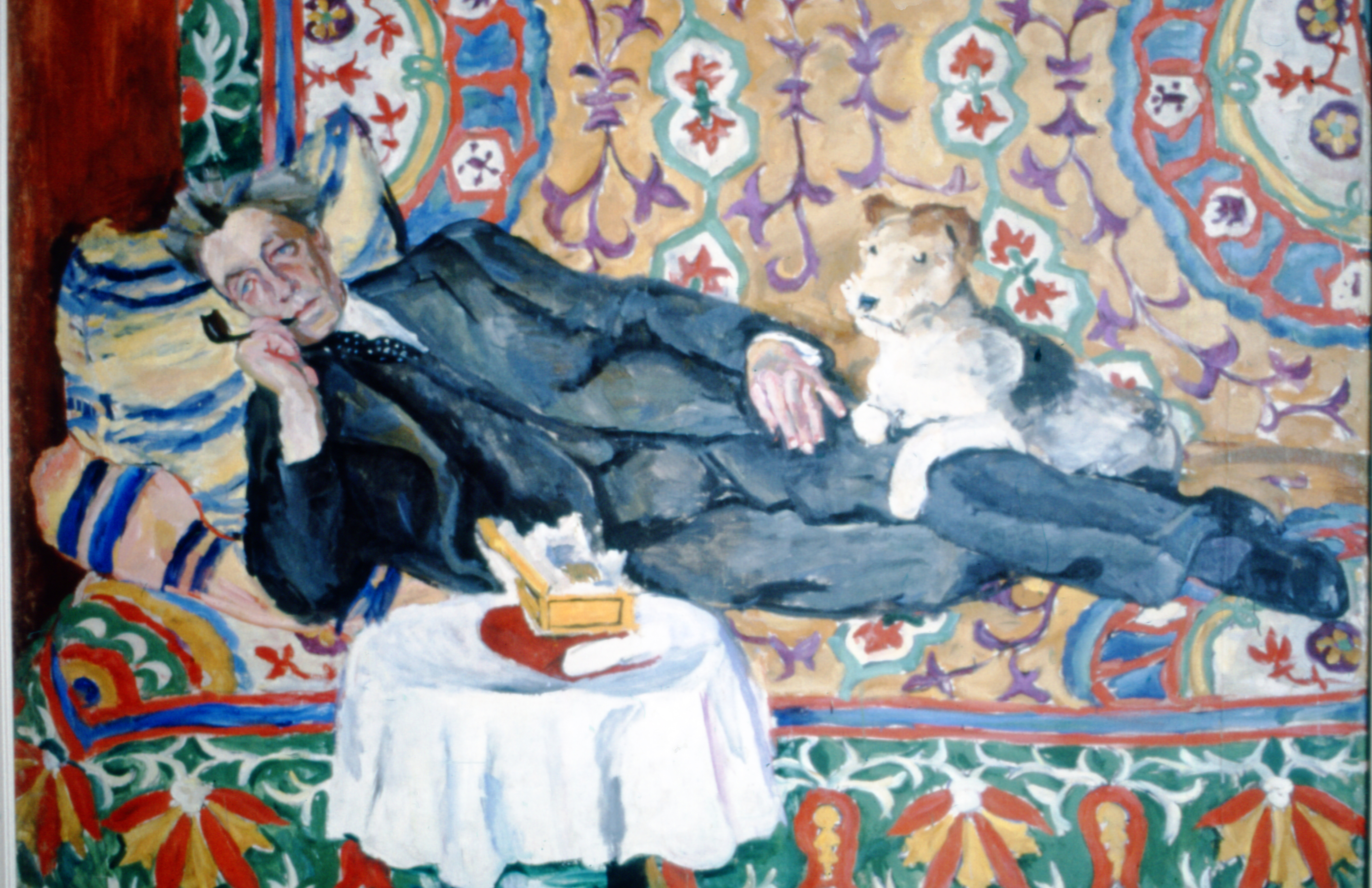
Portrait of Vsevolod Meyerhold (1938)

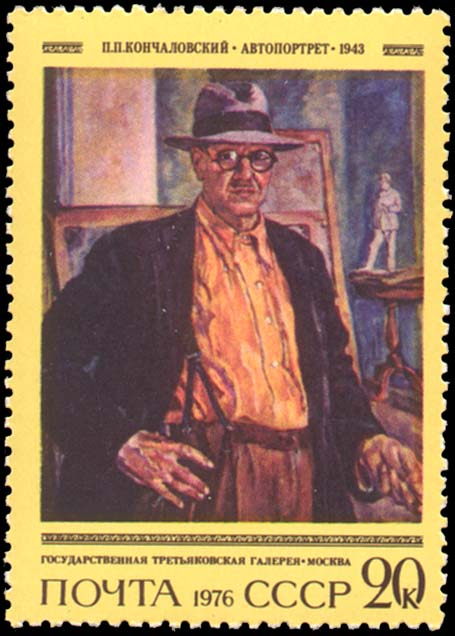
Self-Portrait (1943), shown as on the 1976 Soviet stamp

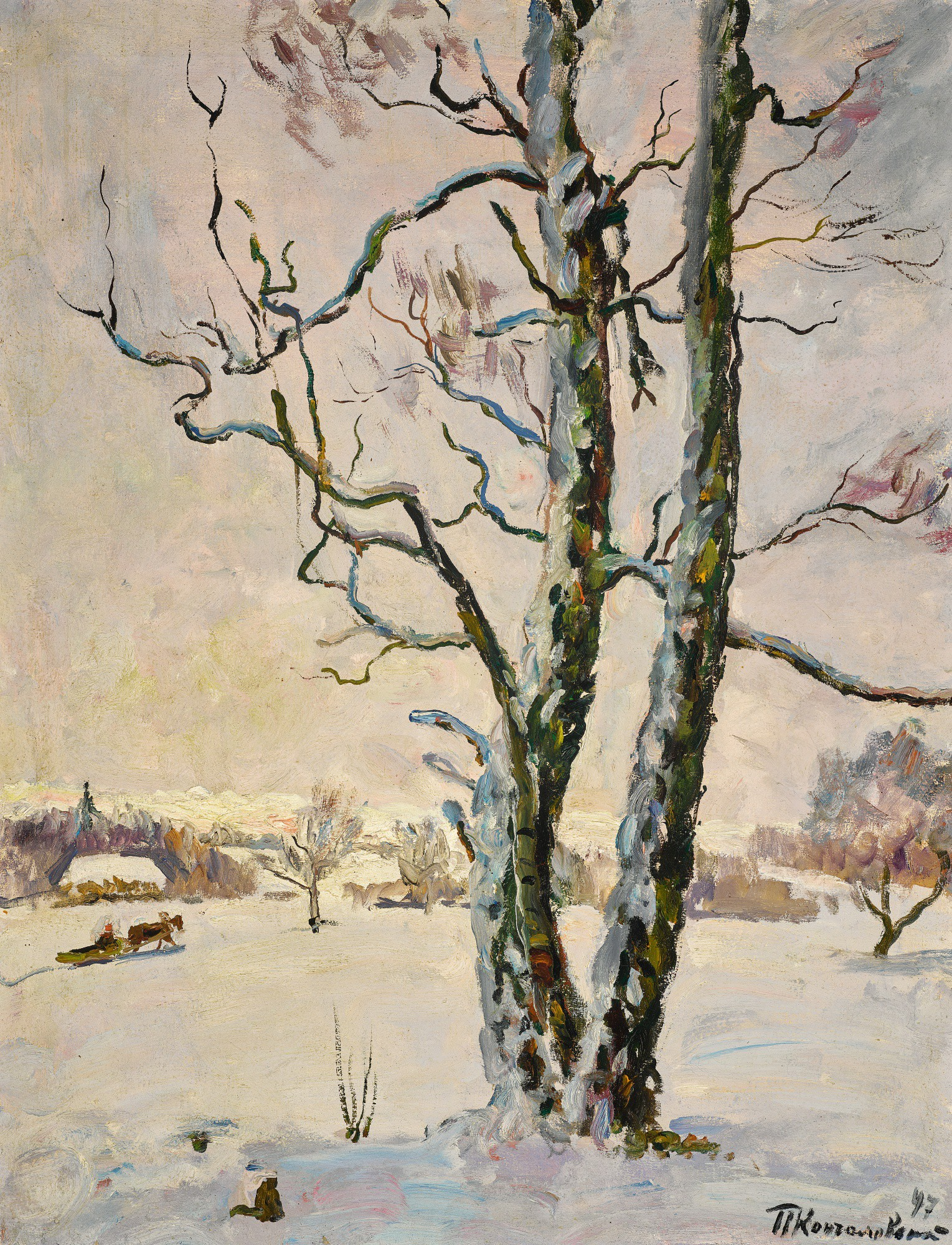
Winter Landscape, birch trees (1947)

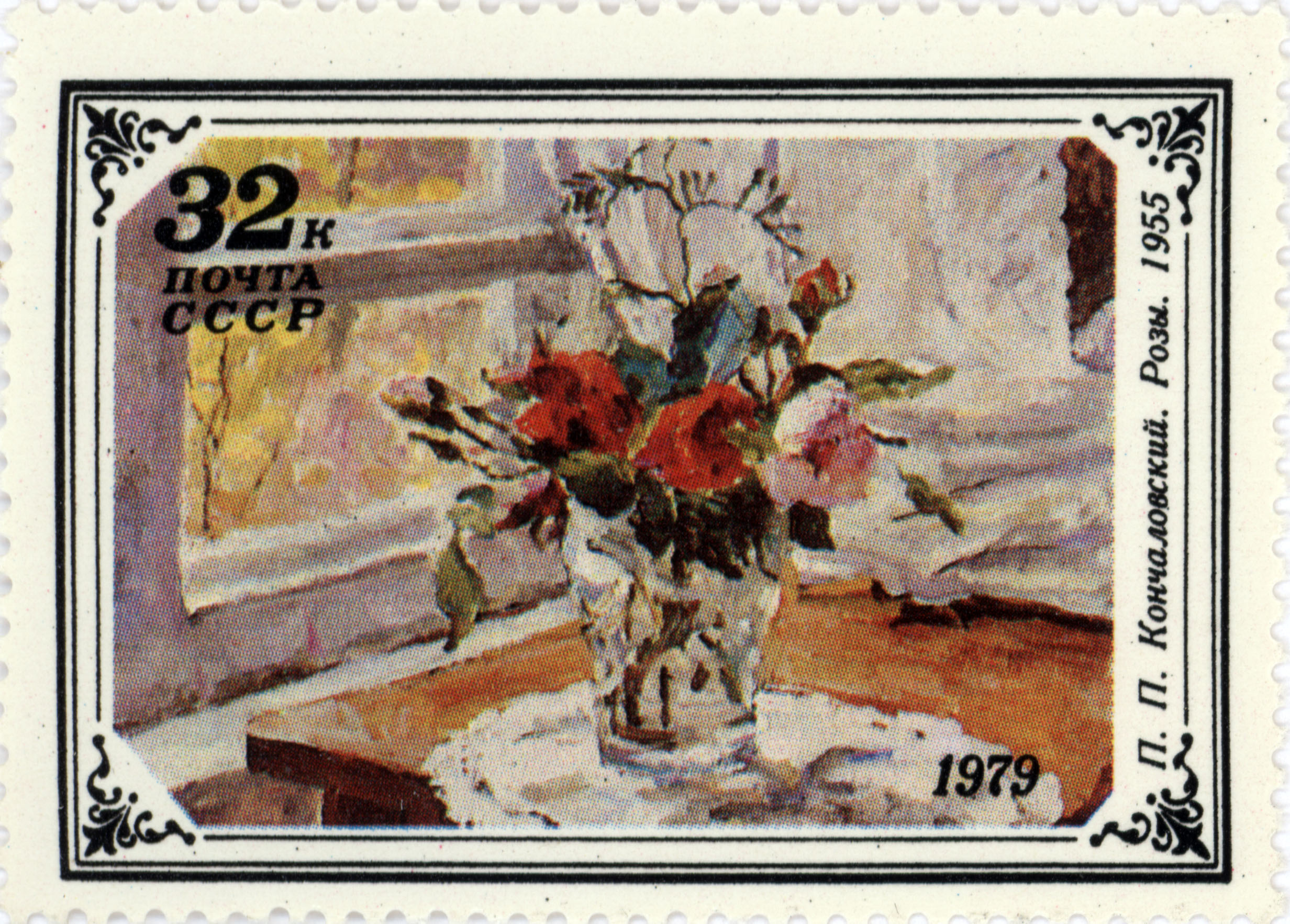
Rose (1955) Soviet Stamp from 1979

== Bibliography ==
- Jean-Claude Marcadé, L'avant-garde russe 1907–1927, Flammarion, 2007. ISBN 978-2-0812-0786-8.
- Valentine Marcadé, Le Renouveau de l'art pictural russe, Édition l'Âge d'homme, Lausanne, 1971
- Nakov Andréi. L'avant-garde russe. Moscow, Art Publishers, 1991. ISBN 5-210-02162-9 (Наков А. Русский авангард = L'avant-garde russe / Пер. с фр. Е. М. Титаренко. — М.: Искусство, 1991. — 192 с. — 25 000 экз. — ISBN 5-210-02162-9)
- Anfänge des russischen Futurismus / Hrsg. von D. Tschižewskij. — Wiesbaden: Otto Harassowitz, 1963. — 122 S.
- Barooshian V. D. Russian cubo-futurism 1910–1930: A study in Avant-Gardism. — The Hague; Paris: Mouton, 1974. — 176 p.
- Russian Art of the Avant-Garde. Theory and Criticism 1902—1934 / Ed. by John E. Bowlt. — New York, 1976.
- Shadowa Larissa A. Suche und Experiment. Russische und sowjetische Kunst 1910 bis 1930. — Dresden: VEB Verlag der Kunst Dresden, 1978. — 372 p.
- Zhadova L. Malevich. Suprematism and Revolution in Russian Art 1910—1930. — London: Thames and Hudson, 1982.
- Russische Avantgarde. Vom Primitivismus zum Konstruktivismus / Hrsg. von Bodo Zelinsky. — Bonn, 1983.
- Krieger V. Von der Ikone zur Utopie. Kunstkonzepte der russischen Avantgarde. — Köln, Weimar, Wien, 1988.
- Glossarium der russischen Avantgarde / Hrsg. von A. Flaker. — Graz, Wien: Droschl, 1989. — 548 S.
- L'avant-garde russe et la synthèse des arts / Ed. par Gérard Conio. — Lausanne, 1990.
- Laboratory of Dreams: The Russian Avant-Garde and Cultural Experiment / Ed. by J. E. Boult and O. Matich. — Stanford: Stanford University Press, 1996. — P. 360.
- Art of the Soviets: Painting, Sculpture & Architecture in a one-Party State, 1917 – 1992 / eds. by M. Bowm, B. Taylor. Manchester, 1993.
- Baudin A. Le Realism Socialiste Sovietique de la Periode Jdanovienne (1947–1953): les Arts Plastiques et leurs Institutions / A. Baudin. Berlin, 1997. Vol. 1.
- Bown M. Socialist Realism Painting / M. Bown. New Haven, 1998.
- Fitzpatrick Sh. The Cultural Front. Power and Culture in Revolutionary Russia / Sh. Fitzpatric. Ithaca; London, 1992.
- Hidden Treasures: Russian and Soviet Impressionism. 1930 – 1970s / ed. by V. Swanson. Scottsdale, 1994.
- Laboratory of Dreams. The Russian Avant-Garde and Cultural Experiment / ed. by J. Bowlt, O. Matich. Stanford,1996.
- Prohorov G. Art Under Socialist Realism: Soviet Painting. 1930 – 1950 / G. Prohorov. East Roseville, 1995.
- Soviet socialist realist painting. 1930s – 1960s / ed. by M. Bown. Oxford, 1992.
- Swanson V. Russian and Soviet Realism, 1930 – 1980 / V. Swanson. Scottsdale, 1993.
- Vasily Rozhdestvensky. Notes of an artist. Moscow, Soviet Artist Publishing House, 1963 (Рождественский В.В. Записки художника. Москва, издательство «Советский художник», 1963)
- Robert Falk. Conversations sur l'art. Courrier. Souvenirs d'un artiste. Moscou, Maison d'édition des artistes soviétiques, 1981. (Р.Р. Фальк. Беседы об искусстве. Письма. Воспоминания о художнике. Москва, издательство «Советский художник», 1981.)
