= Valentin Pokrovsky =

Russian medical scientist (1929–2020)

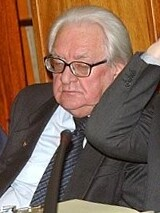
- Born: Valentin Ivanovich Pokrovsky; 1 April 1929; Ivanovo-Voznesensk, RSFSR, Soviet Union
- Died: 29 October 2020 (aged 91)
- Education: I.M. Sechenov First Moscow State Medical University
- Awards: Order of Lenin (1986); Order of the Red Banner of Labour (1971)
- Scientific career
- Fields: Medicine, epidemiology
- Workplaces: Russian Academy of Medical Sciences; Central Research Institute of Epidemiology under the Ministry of Healthcare of the Russian Federation; I.M. Sechenov First Moscow State Medical University

Valentin Ivanovich Pokrovsky (Russian: Валенти́н Ива́нович Покро́вский; 1 April 1929 – 29 October 2020) was a Soviet and Russian medical scientist, epidemiologist and infectionist.

== Career ==
He was born in Ivanovo-Voznesensk, and graduated from the I.M. Sechenov First Moscow State Medical University.

President of the Russian Academy of Medical Sciences from 1987 to 2006, Academician of the Russian Academy of Sciences (since 2013), Director of the Central Research Institute of Epidemiology under the Ministry of Healthcare of the Russian Federation, Professor at the I.M. Sechenov First Moscow State Medical University, Doctor of Medical Sciences (Dsc).

Since 1971 Director of the Central Research Institute of Epidemiology under the Ministry of Healthcare of the Russian Federation.

From 1997 to 2008, Pokrovsky headed the Department of Еpidemiology and Evidence-based medicine at his alma-mater.

Academician of the Russian Academy of Sciences since 2013, Academician of the Russian Academy of Medical Sciences since 1982, Correspondent Member of the Russian Academy of Medical Sciences since 1971.

He was Foreign Member of the National Academy of Sciences of Belarus.

Pokrovsky died on 29 October 2020.

== Awards and honors ==
- Order of the Red Banner of Labour (1971)
- Order of Lenin (1986)
- Order "For Merit to the Fatherland", 3rd class (1994)
- State Prize of the Russian Federation (1997)
- Order "For Merit to the Fatherland", 2nd class (1999)
