= USSR Academy of Medical Sciences =

Soviet government organisation

The USSR Academy of Medical Sciences (Note: (Russian: Акаде́мия медици́нских нау́к СССР)) was the national academy of medical science in the Soviet Union founded in 1944. Its successor was the Russian Academy of Medical Sciences (RAMS), founded in 1992. In October 2013, as part of a reform of the Russian Academy of Sciences (RAS), the RAMS and Russian Academy of Agricultural Science merged with the RAS. RAMS became the Department of Medical Sciences of RAS, and its institutions became part of the said Department.

== Presidents ==
- from 1944 to 1946 – Nikolay Burdenko
- from 1946 to 1953 – Nikolay Anichkov
- from 1953 to 1960 – Aleksandr Bakulev
- from 1960 to 1968 and from 1977 to 1987 – Nikolay Blokhin
- from 1968 to 1977 – Vladimir Timakov
- from 1987 to 2006 – Valentin Pokrovsky
- from 2006 to 2011 – Mikhail Davydov
- from 2011 to 2013 – ru:Дедов, Иван Иванович

== Past and current members ==
- Alexander Gavrilenko (2004)
- Anatoly Pokrovsky
- Galina Savelyeva
- Andrei Snezhnevsky
- Mikhail Chumakov
