= March 1963 =

Month of 1963

<<	March 1963					>>
Su	Mo	Tu	We	Th	Fr	Sa
					1	2
3	4	5	6	7	8	9
10	11	12	13	14	15	16
17	18	19	20	21	22	23
24	25	26	27	28	29	30
31

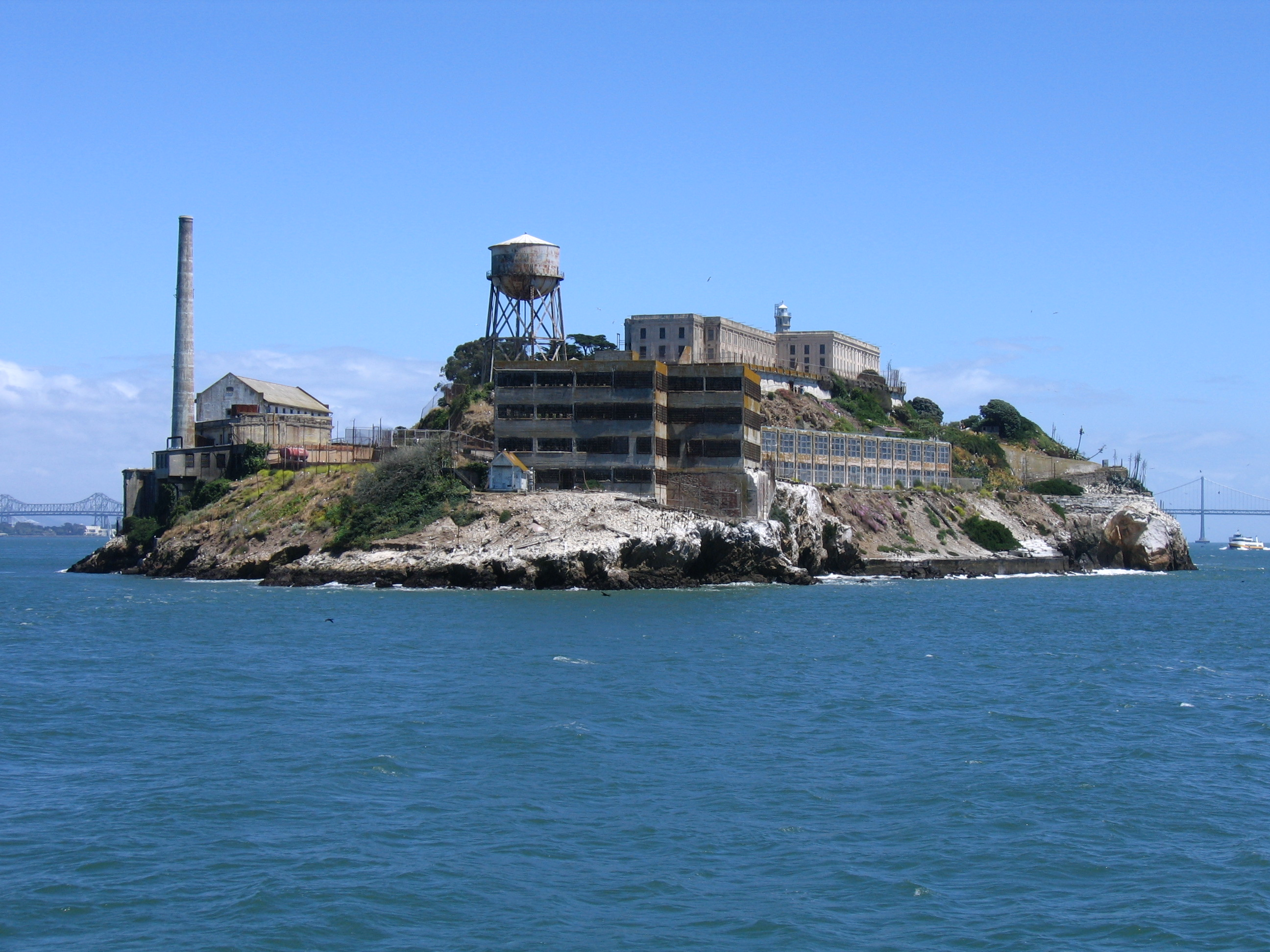
March 21, 1963: Alcatraz prison closes

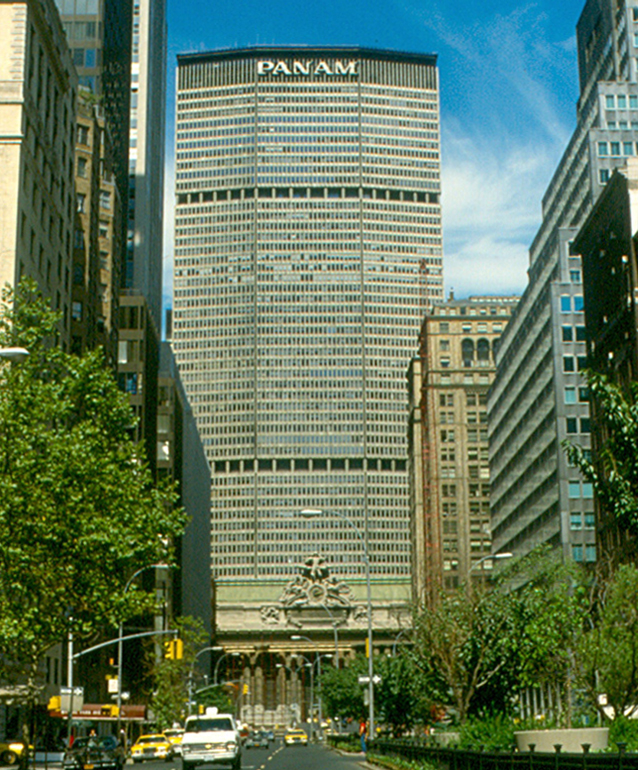
March 7, 1963: Pan Am Building (now the MetLife Building) opens in New York

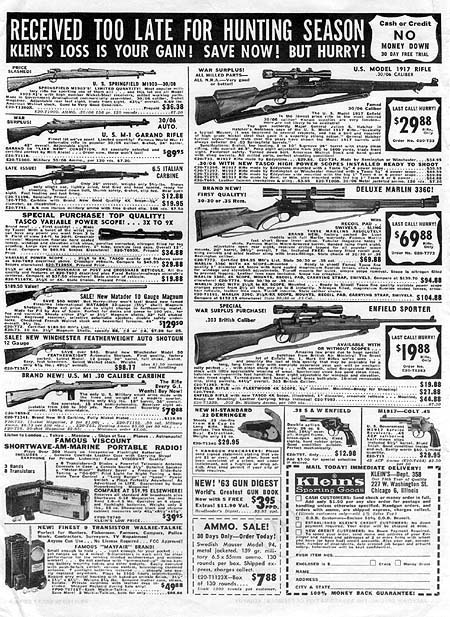
March 12, 1963: Lee Harvey Oswald buys a rifle by mail order

The following events occurred in March 1963:

== March 1, 1963 (Friday) ==
- The Manned Spacecraft Center (MSC) proposed building an orbiting space station, with a capacity for 18 people, to be built with hardware already under development for the Apollo program. The proposal included modifying an Apollo spacecraft, currently designed for three astronauts, to carry as many as six at a time to the station. NASA Deputy Administrator Hugh L. Dryden told the House Committee on Science and Astronautics the station, an obvious project after the lunar landing program ended, would be needed for human exploration of other planets.
- Eurocontrol, the European Organisation for the Safety of Air Navigation, came into existence following the ratifications of a treaty signed on December 13, 1960, by West Germany, France, the United Kingdom, Belgium, Netherlands, the United States, Australia, and Luxembourg.
- Died: Felice Casorati, 79, Italian painter, sculptor and printmaker

== March 2, 1963 (Saturday) ==
- Pakistan's Foreign Minister (and future Prime Minister) Zulfikar Ali Bhutto signed a formal agreement with China's Foreign Minister, Chen Yi, in Beijing to confirm the boundary between the two nations. Pakistan gave up 2,700 square miles (7,000 km^{2}) of Kashmir property that was also claimed by India, while gaining 750 square miles (1,900 km^{2}) of land from China.
- The first attempt at liver transplantation in a human being was made by a team in Denver, led by Dr. Thomas Starzl. The patient, an unidentified 3-year-old child, died shortly after the surgery. On July 23, 1967, Dr. Starzl would perform the first liver transplant where a patient survived for longer than one year.
- Born:
  - Anthony Albanese, Prime Minister of Australia since 2022; in Darlinghurst, Sydney
  - Tanyu Kiryakov, Bulgarian Olympic pistol shooting champion and gold medalist in 1988 and 2000; in Ruse

== March 3, 1963 (Sunday) ==
- General Ricardo Pérez Godoy, the President of Peru and leader of a four-man military junta that had taken power on July 18, 1962, was overthrown by the other three members of the junta, including his Defense Minister, General Nicolas Lindley Lopez. General Lindley pledged to organize new presidential elections and to return Peru to civilian rule.
- The parliamentary election in Monaco was won by the National and Democratic Union, which captured 17 of the 18 seats on the National Council. There were 3,096 voters who participated in the tiny principality.
- In a referendum in Senegal, voters agreed to abolish the office of Prime Minister of Senegal.
- Born: Khaltmaagiin Battulga, 5th President of Mongolia from 2017 to 2021; in Ulaanbaatar

== March 4, 1963 (Monday) ==
- In Paris, six people were sentenced to death for conspiring to assassinate President Charles de Gaulle. Three of the men— Georges Watin, Serge Bernier and Lajos Marton— had eluded capture and were tried, convicted and sentenced in absentia. Lt. Col. Jean-Marie Bastien-Thiry, Lt. Alain de Bougernet, and Jacques Prevost were put on death row. De Gaulle would pardon all but Bastien-Thiry, who would be executed by firing squad on March 11.
- For the first time, the election for the office of Chairman of the Tribal Council of the Navajo Nation was contested among multiple candidates. Paul Jones, who had been the chief executive for the semi-sovereign Navajos since 1955, was defeated by Raymond Nakai, a radio announcer employed in Flagstaff, Arizona.
- The Mona Lisa was displayed in the United States for the last time, when the Metropolitan Museum of Art in New York City closed at 9:00 p.m. The painting was loaded onto a ship the next day for its return to Paris and the Louvre Museum.
- A break in the nearly three-month-long New York City newspaper strike saw the New York Post become the first of nine daily papers to settle with striking printers and to resume publication.
- Kuwait was admitted to the United Nations by unanimous vote of the General Assembly, after the Soviet Union dropped its opposition to the emirate's membership.
- Born: Jason Newsted, American musician, best known as the bassist of heavy metal band Metallica from 1986 to 2001; in Battle Creek, Michigan
- Died:
  - Édouard Belin, 86, French inventor of the wirephoto process that allowed photographs to be transmitted to newspapers for reprinting.
  - William Carlos Williams, 79, American poet

== March 5, 1963 (Tuesday) ==
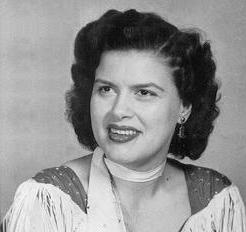
Cline

- In Camden, Tennessee, 30-year-old country music superstar Patsy Cline (Virginia Patterson Hensley) was killed in a plane crash along with fellow performers Harold "Hawkshaw" Hawkins, 41, and Lloyd "Cowboy" Copas, 49, and their manager, Randy Hughes, who was piloting the Piper Comanche airplane. The four were returning to Nashville from a benefit performance in Kansas City, Kansas, for country radio disc jockey "Cactus" Jack Call and had taken off in bad weather after refueling at Dyersburg, Tennessee.
- Gemini Project Office and contractors agreed on general rules for the final phase of the upcoming rendezvous mission. Docking would start after the Agena target vehicle came within range of the Gemini spacecraft's sensors, and automatic and optical terminal guidance would back each other up. Docking would be attempted by the 3rd orbit of the two spacecraft, at the lowest altitude (apogee). Because of range radar tracking limitations, no midcourse corrections would be made during orbits 4 through 11 if the first try failed. A second try would be made after the 12th orbit. In case of extreme errors, the Agena would be maneuvered to bring it within the Gemini spacecraft's reach.
- NASA Headquarters published a study on the ejection of an instrument package from an orbiting spacecraft, for both visual and electronic observation experiments. If successful, the observation acuity could be determined to assist the rendezvous portion of the Project Gemini flights.
- In China, the "Learn from Lei Feng" campaign was instituted by Chinese Communist Party chairman Mao Zedong, making a hero of the 21-year-old soldier who had been accidentally killed on August 15, 1962.
- Born Joe Exotic (stage name for Joseph Schreibvogel), American tiger breeder and convicted felon; in Garden City, Kansas

== March 6, 1963 (Wednesday) ==
- Great Britain's longest, coldest winter in the 20th century started to end, with the ground being snow-free for the first time since the blizzard over the Christmas period. Many places saw their first frost-free night of the year and since before Christmas. The south saw temperatures rise above freezing and into the low 60s Fahrenheit (17 °C).
- Prime Minister Robert Menzies of Australia opened the new Monaro Shopping Centre, one of the first shopping malls in Australia, in Canberra. In 1989, the structure would be expanded and become the Canberra Centre.
- Construction began on the Unisphere, a 120-foot (37 m) diameter Earth globe and the symbol of the 1964 World's Fair in New York.

== March 7, 1963 (Thursday) ==
- The 58-story-tall Pan Am Building (now the MetLife Building) opened at 200 Park Avenue in New York City. With more than three million square feet of floor space, it was the largest commercial office building in the world at the time of its completion.
- The Front de libération du Québec (FLQ), a militant organization seeking to make Quebec independent of the rest of Canada, made its first attack, firebombing a wooden building in Montreal at the Canadian National Railway.
- The first horse race meeting in England since December 23, 1962, took place, after scheduled races had been called off due to the severe winter conditions.
- The Gemini Program Planning Board created an ad hoc study group to compare NASA and U.S. Department of Defense (DOD) objectives for the Gemini program and to recommend DOD experiments for inclusion in the Gemini flight program. The group would present its final report to the Board on May 6.

== March 8, 1963 (Friday) ==
- The 8 March Revolution took place in Syria as a military coup deposed President Nazim al-Kudsi and restored the Ba'ath party, led by Salah al-Din al-Bitar to power.
- Paul Caraway, the U.S. High Commissioner of the Ryuku Islands, suggested that the Ryukyuan people weren't competent enough to govern the island. Outraged government workers began a campaign for Caraway to be removed from office. Despite the dissatisfaction with his administration, Lieutenant General Caraway would remain in office for another 16 months until retiring from the U.S. Army.
- For the first time in British history, the 25 members of the Scots Guards, personal protectors for Queen Elizabeth II, walked off of their jobs. The grievance, reportedly, was that there was "too much spit and polish".
- Died: Jack Anglin, 46, American country music singer, lost control of his car near Madison, Tennessee, while driving to Nashville to attend a memorial service for Patsy Cline, and died of a fractured skull.

== March 9, 1963 (Saturday) ==
- Mohammed Daoud Khan resigned after nine and a half years as Prime Minister of Afghanistan, at the request of his cousin, King Mohammed Zahir Shah, who instituted a constitutional monarchy. Daoud would overthrow the King on July 17, 1973, and become the first President of Afghanistan, and would be assassinated on April 28, 1978.
- In what one author describes as "arguably the most infamous cop-killing of all time", two Los Angeles policemen were kidnapped after pulling over a car driven by Gregory Powell. After their car was stopped at Gower Street and Carlos Avenue in Hollywood, Powell and his accomplice, Jimmy Lee Smith, disarmed the two policemen, Ian Campbell and Karl Hettinger, forced them into their car, then drove them to an onion field in Kern County, California. Powell shot Campbell five times, but Hettinger escaped. In 1973, Author Joseph Wambaugh would write The Onion Field, a bestselling book about the kidnap and murder.
- An explosion killed 16 employees of the Stepmann Metalworks in Belecke, a section of Warstein in West Germany, and injured 40 others.
- The Église Saint-Germain, Royère-de-Vassivière, was designated a monument historique by the French government.

== March 10, 1963 (Sunday) ==
- The first air show for the "Confederate Air Force", a group dedicated to preserving World War II aircraft, took place, in Texas. The organization was renamed the Commemorative Air Force in later years.
- Born: Rick Rubin, American record executive and record producer who co-founded Def Jam Recordings; in Long Beach, New York
- Died: Brian O'Higgins, 80, Irish politician and leader of Sinn Féin from 1931 to 1933

== March 11, 1963 (Monday) ==
- The second half-scale test vehicle in the Gemini Paraglider Development Program was destroyed while being tested. The paraglider concept was retained but its the development program was reoriented. By May 5, paraglider would be downgraded to a research and development program and all three earlier paraglider contracts would be terminated.
- An unidentified flying object, described as a "hazy white light", was seen by hundreds of residents of the "Big Island" of Hawaii, where it hovered for more than five minutes.
- Born: Alex Kingston, English actress; in Epsom, Surrey
- Died: Jean Bastien-Thiry, 35, French military officer and engineer, was executed by firing squad after being convicted of attempting to assassinate French President Charles de Gaulle on August 22, 1962.

== March 12, 1963 (Tuesday) ==
- Lee Harvey Oswald, using the name of "A. Hidell", mailed a money order in the amount of $21.45 to Klein's Sporting Goods of Chicago, along with a coupon clipped from the February 1963 issue of American Rifleman magazine, to purchase a rifle that would be used eight months later to kill President John F. Kennedy.
- North American Aviation awarded the first of three major subcontracts for the Gemini Paraglider Landing System Program, with Northrop Corporation receiving $461,312 for a parachute recovery system. A $1,034,003 subcontract for the paraglider control actuation assembly went to the Aerospace Division of Vickers, Inc., on March 25, and a $708,809 subcontract for the paraglider electronic control system was let to the Aeronautical Division of Minneapolis-Honeywell on May 13.
- Born: Randall Kenan, American author (d. 2020); in Brooklyn

== March 13, 1963 (Wednesday) ==
- Ernesto Miranda, a 22-year-old warehouse employee, was arrested in Phoenix, Arizona, on suspicion of rape, and subsequently convicted based on statements that he made to the police without being advised of his constitutional right not to incriminate himself. He would fight the conviction to the United States Supreme Court, leading to the landmark 1966 decision in Miranda v. Arizona. His name lives on in the name of the instructions that all police are required to give to persons arrested, beginning with "You have the right to remain silent", referred to as the Miranda warning, and in the phrase "Miranda rights".
- Up-and-coming heavyweight boxer Cassius Clay almost had his career derailed in a bout at New York City's Madison Square Garden, against Doug Jones. Although the future Muhammad Ali had predicted he would defeat Jones in four rounds, Clay appeared to be losing the bout as it went into round 7. Scheduled for only ten rounds, the fight ended in a decision in favor of Clay, with many in the crowd protesting that it had been fixed. Clay would win the right to face Sonny Liston the following year and win the title.
- The Soviet Union announced that Mao Zedong, the Chairman of the Chinese Communist Party, had invited Soviet Party First Secretary Nikita Khrushchev to visit Beijing. Chairman Mao had made the proposal on February 23 to Soviet Ambassador Stepan Chervonenko, in an effort to close the growing rift between the world's two largest Communist nations.
- Lake Powell began to form inside Arizona's Glen Canyon, as construction of a dam of the Colorado River neared completion, though it would not be considered completely full until March 13, 1980. It is now the second largest human-made lake in the United States.
- Premier Nikita Khrushchev appointed Dmitriy Ustinov as the new First Deputy Premier of the Soviet Union. Ustinov would later serve as the Soviet Minister of Defense.

== March 14, 1963 (Thursday) ==
- In the British courts, Ridge v Baldwin, a landmark case in the law of judicial review, was decided on appeal, holding that a public official cannot be dismissed without first being given notice of the grounds on which the decision was made, as well as an opportunity to be heard in his own defence.
- Mohammad Yusuf, Afghanistan's Minister of Mines and Industry, became the new Prime Minister of Afghanistan, as King Mohammed Zahir Shah appointed the first cabinet that did not include any members of the royal family, and the first to be dominated by technical experts.
- Robert Simpson's Symphony No. 3 was performed for the first time, premiered in England by the City of Birmingham Symphony Orchestra.
- McDonnell Aircraft Corporation concluded that getting a Gemini spacecraft ready again after the scrubbing of a mission would take at least 24½ hours between launches. Manned Spacecraft Center (MSC) worked at trying to lessen the time. MSC needed this information to determine capability of meeting launch windows on successive days in the rendezvous portion of the Gemini program.
- Born: Mike Muir, American singer and lead vocalist of the hardcore band Suicidal Tendencies; in Venice, Los Angeles

== March 15, 1963 (Friday) ==
- The first confirmed penetration of United States airspace by Soviet military aircraft took place with two violations on the same day over the state of Alaska. One Soviet reconnaissance plane flew over Nelson Island, while the other made a pass over Nunivak Island.
- Lloyd Aéreo Boliviano Flight 915, with 41 people on board for a one-hour flight to the Bolivian capital of La Paz, departed from the Chilean city of Arica at noon and never arrived. The wreckage of the Douglas DC-6 airplane would be found three days later on a slope of the Chachakumani Mountain in Bolivia.
- The Saturday Evening Post magazine issued a statement that athletic director Wally Butts of Georgia, and college football coach Bear Bryant of Alabama, had "fixed" the September 22, 1962, game between the Georgia Bulldogs and the Alabama Crimson Tide. According to the Post, its upcoming issue on March 19 would give details of Butts supplying Georgia's plays to Bryant in advance of Alabama's 35–0 win in a game where the point spread was a 14-to-17-point win. Both Bryant and Butts denied the allegations. Butts would win a $3,000,000 libel judgment against the Post on August 20.
- Died: Victor Feguer, 27, became the last federal inmate executed in the United States before the 1972 moratorium on the death penalty, after his conviction for kidnapping a physician in Iowa and murdering him in Illinois. Feguer, who had been held at the federal penitentiary in Leavenworth, Kansas, had been transported to the Iowa State Penitentiary, where he was hanged, becoming the last person to be legally executed in the state of Iowa. For the next 38 years, no more federal inmates would be put to death until the June 11, 2001, lethal injection of terrorist Timothy McVeigh.

== March 16, 1963 (Saturday) ==
- The British scientific journal, Nature, published an article by Maarten Schmidt titled "3C 273 : A Star-Like Object with Large Red-Shift", marking the first announcement of the discovery of a quasar (quasi-stellar radio source).
- Died: Sir William Beveridge, 84, British economist, social reformer, and architect of the post-war welfare state in the United Kingdom.

== March 17, 1963 (Sunday) ==
- The eruption of the Mount Agung volcano killing 1,150 people on the Indonesian island of Bali. On February 19, the volcano had killed 17 people after being dormant for more than a century, and then had a more violent eruption a month later.
- Elizabeth Ann Seton (1774–1821) was beatified in the Roman Catholic Church in a ceremony led by Pope John XXIII at Vatican City. On September 14, 1975, she would become the first American native to be canonized as a saint.
- Died: Adalberto Libera, 59, Italian architect

== March 18, 1963 (Monday) ==
- Somalia broke diplomatic relations with the United Kingdom because of Britain's support for Kenya in a border dispute between the two African nations.
- The United States Supreme Court issued its opinion in Gideon v. Wainwright, establishing the principle that any criminal defendant, unable to afford to pay for a lawyer, had an absolute right to have a public defender appointed for him or her, at government expense.
- On the same day, the Supreme Court issued an 8 to 1 decision in Gray v. Sanders, striking down the county-unit system of voting. In the U.S. state of Georgia, state law awarded at least two "unit votes" to the candidate winning even the least populated rural county, and no more than six such units to the most populated counties. Justice William O. Douglas wrote "The conception of political equality... can mean only one thing— one person, one vote." At the time of the ruling, only Georgia, Mississippi, and Maryland retained the system.
- Born: Vanessa L. Williams, American pop singer, and first African-American woman to be crowned Miss America; in Tarrytown, New York
- Died: Sir Hubert Gough, 92, British general

== March 19, 1963 (Tuesday) ==
- The Manned Spacecraft Center received a slow-scan television camera system, fabricated by Lear Siegler, Incorporated, for integration with Gordon Cooper's Mercury 9. Designed to be compact, the 8-pound (3.6 kg) TV camera could be focused on the pilot or used by the astronaut on other objects inside or outside the spacecraft. Ground support was installed at Mercury Control Center, the Canary Islands, and a "command ship" in the Pacific Ocean to receive and transmit pictures every two seconds.
- The 89-year-old ship SS Arctic Bear, which had served in the United States Coast Guard and the navy of Canada and had assisted the Antarctic exploration by Admiral Richard E. Byrd, sank while being towed from Nova Scotia to Philadelphia, where it was to be used as a floating restaurant.

== March 20, 1963 (Wednesday) ==
- Hope Cooke, a 22-year-old American student at Sarah Lawrence College, had a royal wedding, marrying Palden Thondup Namgyal, the Crown Prince of the Himalayan Kingdom of Sikkim. For nearly ten years, she was the Queen of Sikkim, until the semi-independent monarchy was annexed into neighboring India in 1973. She later divorced Palden and returned to the United States.
- The United States and the Soviet Union signed an agreement in Rome to work jointly on a weather satellite program.
- Qualification tests began for the production prototype ablation heatshield for the Gemini spacecraft.
- Born: David Thewlis (stage name for David Wheeler), English actor; in Blackpool, Lancashire

== March 21, 1963 (Thursday) ==
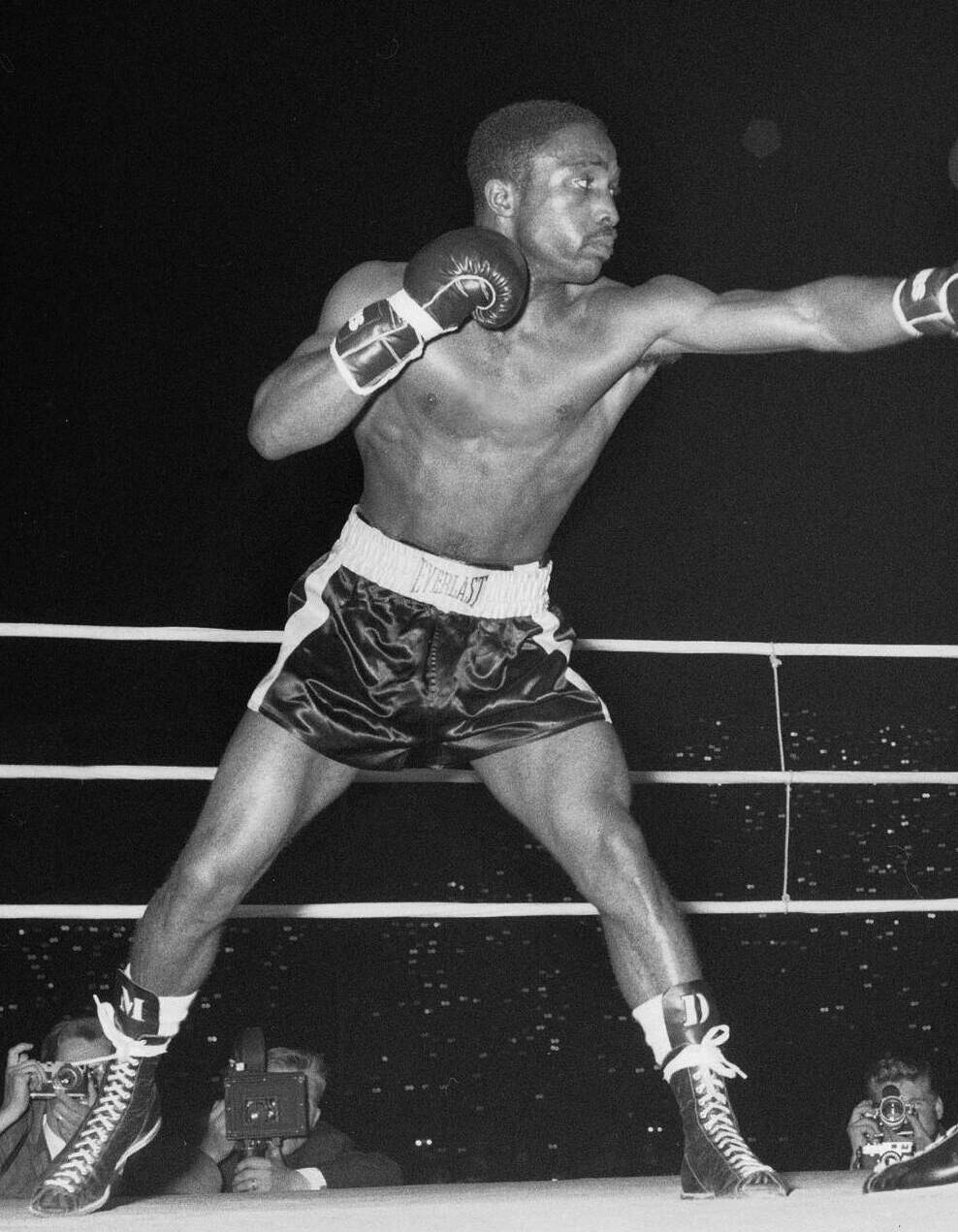
Moore

- World featherweight boxing champion Davey Moore was fatally injured in a bout with challenger Sugar Ramos at Dodger Stadium in Los Angeles. In the 10th round, the fight was stopped after Moore had been knocked down twice and was slumped over the ropes of the boxing ring, and Ramos was declared the new champion. Forty-five minutes later, after Moore told reporters, "I'd like to fight him again", the dethroned champion collapsed in his dressing room and never regained consciousness. Moore would die four days later at a Los Angeles hospital.
- The first vaccine against measles, produced by Merck Sharp & Dohme, was approved by the U.S. Food and Drug Administration (FDA).
- The Alcatraz Island federal penitentiary in San Francisco Bay closed because it cost twice as much to operate as other units in the federal system. The last 27 prisoners were transferred elsewhere at the order of Attorney General Robert F. Kennedy. Frank P. Weatherman was the last of the 27 inmates to depart the prison.
- All communication was lost from the Soviet Union's Mars 1 spacecraft because of a malfunction in its antenna. The probe would become the first man-made object to reach Mars, flying within 120,000 miles (190,000 km) of the Red Planet on June 19.
- At an MSC meeting, guidelines were set for Gemini extravehicular operations. Astronauts venturing from the capsule for a "spacewalk" would wear a modified pressure suit with loose thermal covering, gloves and boots. During extravehicular operations, the astronaut would remain attached to the capsule at all times with a tether long enough (25 feet (7.6 m)) to allow access to the spacecraft. The adapter section would include 12 nylon-encapsulated communications wires. The tether's only purpose was to keep the astronaut attached to the spacecraft, while maneuvering and maintaining stability would be accomplished by other means. The design specification was for 30 minutes of useful time outside the Gemini spacecraft, starting with spacecraft number 4.
- At a conference of the Australian Labor Party, called to debate the building of a North-west Cape communications facility which would support the U.S. nuclear submarine capability, Arthur Calwell and Gough Whitlam were photographed outside the venue at Kingston, Australian Capital Territory, a suburb of Canberra. Although Calwell was the Leader of the Opposition, neither man was a member of the federal executive. Prime Minister Robert Menzies jibed that the Australian Labor Party was ruled by "36 faceless men".
- A $33,797,565 contract was signed with Philco Corporation to implement the Integrated Mission Control Center.

== March 22, 1963 (Friday) ==
- British Secretary for War John Profumo responded to a charge made the day before in the House of Commons that he had behaved inappropriately with a missing 20-year-old call girl Christine Keeler. Labour MP George Wigg had asked the government to hold hearings on Profumo's conduct. Profumo responded that "there was no impropriety whatsoever in my acquaintanceship with Miss Keeler". Profumo, who had actually had an extramarital relationship with Christine Keeler, compounded the problem by telling his fellow Members of Parliament, "I shall not hesitate to issue writs for libel and slander if scandalous allegations are made or repeated outside the House."
- The Shah of Iran, who had already started a crackdown on the nation's Shi'ite clergy and their followers, sent soldiers to arrest theology students of the Ayatollah Ruhollah Khomeini at the Fayziya Madrasa at Qom. Two of the students were beaten to death, and dozens other arrested, becoming the first martyrs of the Shah's campaign against the clergy, and Khomeini would begin his defiance of the Shah in June.
- The Beatles released their first album, Please Please Me.
- Born: Susan Ann Sulley, English vocalist for The Human League; in Sheffield, South Yorkshire

== March 23, 1963 (Saturday) ==
- Loyola University won the NCAA college basketball championship, defeating the University of Cincinnati Bearcats, 60–58, in overtime. The Ramblers of Loyola had played all of regulation time without ever taking the lead, and fought back from a 45–30 deficit to tie the game at 54–54 on a jump shot by Jerry Harkness, before upsetting the defending national champion Bearcats on a tip-in by Vic Rouse.
- Microbiologist Maurice Hilleman began the development of the Mumpsvax vaccine against the mumps virus, by harvesting the live virus from his five-year-old daughter. The strain of mumps virus that was used to develop the vaccine was given the name "Jeryl Lynn" after the little girl, Jeryl Lynn Hilleman. Hilleman who would develop nearly 40 vaccines, including eight of the 14 on the worldwide vaccination schedule
- "Dansevise", sung by Grethe and Jørgen Ingmann (music by Otto Francker, lyrics by Sejr Volmer-Sørensen), won the Eurovision Song Contest 1963 for Denmark.
- France defeated Wales 5 to 3 in the final match of the 1963 Five Nations Championship in rugby, although England was already assured of the championship.
- Died: Thoralf Skolem, 75, Norwegian mathematician

== March 24, 1963 (Sunday) ==
- Lord Brookeborough (Basil Brooke), who had served as Prime Minister of Northern Ireland since 1943, retired. The next day, the Home Secretary of the United Kingdom appointed Terence O'Neill as the new Prime Minister.
- The influential animated film Wanpaku Ōji no Orochi Taiji was released in Japan. Based on folk tales first written down in the year 712, the film was given a title that literally translated to "The Bratty Prince and the Giant Snake". It would be redubbed in English by Columbia Pictures for release in the U.S. as The Little Prince and the Eight-Headed Dragon.

== March 25, 1963 (Monday) ==
- Pilot Ralph Flores and his passenger, Helen Klaben, were rescued, 49 days after their plane crashed in northern British Columbia. On February 4, Flores and Klaben had disappeared on their way back to the United States, and survived in sub-zero temperatures with almost no food for seven weeks. The story was made into the film Hey, I'm Alive, with Edward Asner and Sally Struthers portraying the two survivors.
- Isser Harel was fired as Director of the Mossad, Israel's intelligence agency. His dismissal followed his defiance of Prime Minister David Ben-Gurion's attempt to stop West German scientists from working on rockets in Egypt. In Harel's place, Major General Meir Amit was appointed.
- During an official visit to Australia, Queen Elizabeth II opened the Council House, Perth.
- Born: Robbie Fulks, American country music singer; in York, Pennsylvania
- Died:
  - Davey Moore, 29, American professional boxer who lost his world featherweight championship in a bout four days earlier against Sugar Ramos, died of his injuries sustained in the fight.
  - Lyman Briggs, 88, American physicist, inventor and agricultural engineer

== March 26, 1963 (Tuesday) ==
- Muhammetnazar Gapurow became Chairman of the Council of Ministers of the Turkmen Soviet Socialist Republic.
- Born: Connie Culp, American crime victim who, in 2008, became the first American recipient of a face transplant (d. 2020); in East Liverpool, Ohio

== March 27, 1963 (Wednesday) ==
British Rail network, as it would have become if "Beeching axe" plans had been fully implemented (only bolded rail lines would have remained)

- Dr. Richard Beeching, the Chairman of British Railways, issued the report The Reshaping of British Railways, calling for huge cuts to the United Kingdom's rail network. Over a 12-year period, passenger service would be halted permanently at 29 separate rail routes. An author would note later that 4,500 miles (7,200 km) of routes, 2,500 stations, and 67,700 jobs would be ended by the closures.
- Grigori Nelyubov, Ivan Anikeyev and Valentin Filatyev, three of the original 20 cosmonauts selected for the Soviet space program, ended their careers when they got drunk and then got into an argument with military guards at the Chkalovskaya subway station in Moscow. Rather than making it into outer space, all three were dismissed from the program.
- Born:
  - Quentin Tarantino, American director, screenwriter, producer, cinematographer and actor; in Knoxville, Tennessee
  - Xuxa (stage name for Maria da Graça Meneghel), Brazilian children's television personality; in Santa Rosa, Rio Grande do Sul
- Died: Wallace C. Halsey, 44, American evangelist, survivalist and UFO researcher, was killed in a plane crash along with the pilot, Harry Ross Jr, the former mayor of Seal Beach, California. Halsey and Ross had departed from Huntington Beach, California on a flight to Logan, Utah and their Piper Tri-Pacer airplane could not be located after an extensive search. Their fate remained unknown for 13 years until a deer hunter found the wreckage on October 30, 1976, on a mountainside near St. George, Utah.

== March 28, 1963 (Thursday) ==
- Four women in Kankakee, Illinois, claimed that they were dealt four perfect bridge hands, with the dealer getting all 13 spades in her 13 playing cards, her partner having 13 diamonds, and the other two players having 13 hearts and 13 clubs. According to a probability expert, the odds were "2,554,511,322,166,132,992,844,640,000 to one" against the event. On October 22, a group of women in Jacksonville, Florida, would report being dealt four perfect hands and a group of women in Fort Lauderdale, Florida would report the same incident on January 27, 1964. The Guinness Book of World Records has noted that "if all the people in the world were grouped in bridge fours, and each four were dealt 120 hands a day, it would require 62 × 10^{12} years before one 'perfect' deal could be expected to recur."
- In northern Nigeria, Muhammad Sanusi was forced to resign as the Emir of Kano, along with 14 other emirate officials, after a four-month investigation found irregularities in the area's finances.
- In Wales, Labour Party candidate Neil McBride won the Swansea East by-election caused by the death of Labour Member of Parliament (MP) David Mort.
- For the Mercury 9 mission, pilot Gordon Cooper and backup pilot Alan Shepard received runs on the Johnsville centrifuge.
- In the American civil rights movement, over 100 high school students in Rome, Georgia, conducted a set of sit-in protests at lunch counters in department stores. Sixty-two of the protesters were arrested after refusing to leave, and bail for each teenager was set at $102 (equivalent to $1,006 in 2023). The sit-ins took place without incident, and although Rome, Georgia, had already desegregated its bus system and its public library, a spokesman for the city's chamber of commerce said that "he was not optimistic about lunch counter integration."
- Born: Bernice King, American lawyer, minister, and the youngest child of civil rights leaders Martin Luther King Jr. and Coretta Scott King; in Atlanta

== March 29, 1963 (Friday) ==
- A bolt of lightning struck the nose of a TWA Boeing 707 shortly after it took off a flight from London to New York and tore a 21-inch (530 mm) by 8-inch (200 mm) hole in the fuselage. The TWA pilot jettisoned 10,000 U.S. gallons of fuel while circling for 35 minutes over southwestern England before safely landing at London with his 110 passengers, who included 22 Methodist ministers on their way home from a tour of Israel, MGM Films President Robert O'Brien, and film actor Warren Beatty.
- The government of Cuba made "the hostile Castro regime's first apology to the United States," conceding that Cuban MiG jets had "probably fired in error" on the Floridian, an American merchant ship, the night before.
- Died:
  - Gaspard Fauteux, 64, Speaker of the Canadian House of Commons (1945–1949) and the 19th Lieutenant Governor of Quebec (1950–1958).
  - Ruby Agnes Owens, 54, American country singer who performed as "Texas Ruby", was killed in a fire at her mobile home near Nashville

== March 30, 1963 (Saturday) ==
- The first direct dialed trans-Atlantic telephone calls were made between the United Kingdom and the United States, through switching stations at London and White Plains, New York.
- Quarter-final matches in the 1962–63 FA Cup football competition were played after a postponement of three weeks, resulting from other match delays caused by the severe winter in the UK.
- Graham Hill won the 1963 Lombank Trophy motor race at Snetterton circuit, UK.
- Born: Tsakhiagiin Elbegdorj, President of Mongolia from 2009 to 2017 and Prime Minister in 1998 and again from 2004 to 2006; in Zereg

== March 31, 1963 (Sunday) ==
- A military coup in Guatemala overthrew the government of President Miguel Ydígoras Fuentes, who was flown to exile in Nicaragua after the takeover by his Defense Minister, Colonel Enrique Peralta Azurdia. The coup took place after Juan José Arévalo, a Communist supporter and former President, returned to Guatemala and announced that he would run in the November presidential election. Ex-President Ydígoras, who had believed that Arévalo had a good chance of winning the race, told reporters the next day, "What is going on in Guatemala is for her own good and for the good of the rest of Central America." Peralta would remain in power until 1966.
- The 1962 New York City newspaper strike ended after 114 days. The New York Times and the New York Herald-Tribune printed and sold editions that night, at a new price (10 cents), twice as much as before the strike began on December 6.
- The 1963 South American Championship football competition was won by host country Bolivia.
- Walter Nash retired as Leader of the New Zealand Labour Party.
