= Grigory Nelyubov =

Soviet cosmonaut

- Григорий Нелюбов
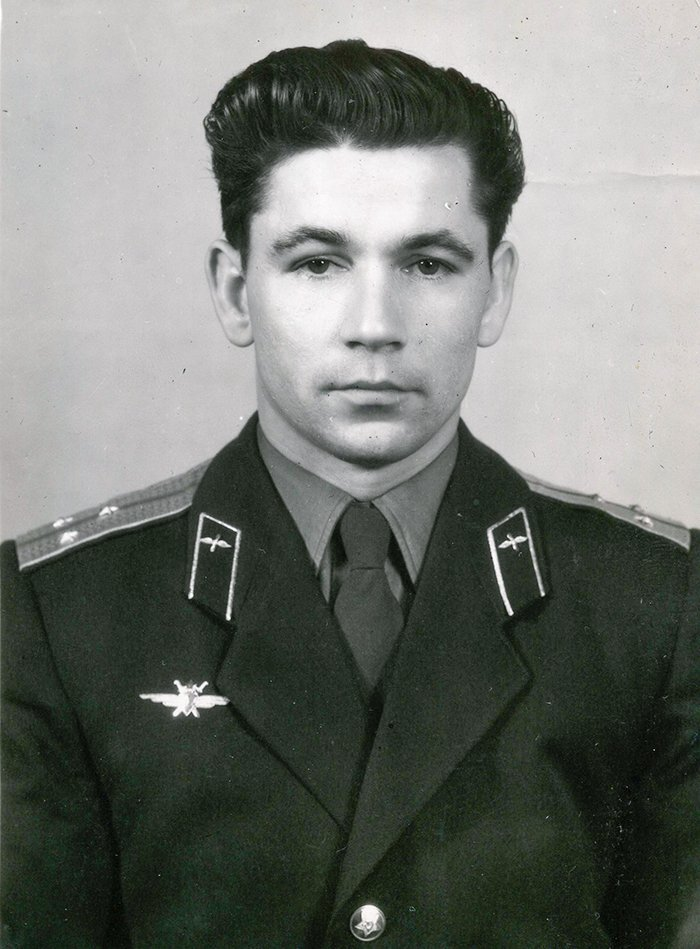
- Nelyubov in 1960
- Born: 31 March 1934; Crimean ASSR, Soviet Union
- Died: 18 February 1966 (aged 31); Vladivostok, Russia, Soviet Union
- Space career

Soviet Cosmonaut
- Missions: None

Grigory Grigoryevich Nelyubov (Russian: Григо́рий Григо́рьевич Нелю́бов; 31 March 1934 – 18 February 1966) was one of the original 20 Soviet cosmonauts, who was dismissed from the Soviet space program in 1963 for drunk and disorderly conduct. His existence in the program was kept secret until the advent of Soviet glasnost in the late 1980s. He committed suicide on 18 February 1966.

== Life ==
=== Early life and selection ===
Born in the village of Porfiryevka, Crimea in USSR, Nelyubov was a captain and pilot in the Soviet Air Force. He was selected as one of the original 20 cosmonauts on 7 March 1960 along with Yuri Gagarin. The following year, six of the original twenty were evaluated for assignment on Vostok flight crews between January 17 and 18; Gagarin, Titov, and Nelyubov were considered the top three candidates. For Vostok 1 Nelyubov was chosen as second backup for Gagarin and presumably first backup for Vostok 2 for Titov in April and August 1961 respectively. For the dual launches of Vostok 3 and Vostok 4, Nelyubov was again chosen as a backup for Andrian Nikolayev and Pavel Popovich.

=== Arrest ===
On 27 March 1963, Nelyubov, Ivan Anikeyev and Valentin Filatyev resisted while being arrested for drunk and disorderly conduct by the military security patrol (комендатура) at Chkalovskaya station. According to reports, the duty officer agreed to ignore the whole incident and not send the report if Nelyubov apologized, but he refused, and the matter was reported to the authorities. Because there were previous incidents, all three were dismissed from the cosmonaut corps on 17 April 1963, though officially not until 4 May 1963. Pavel Popovich, secretary of the party organization, tried to resolve the situation by calling a party meeting where Nelyubov was once again invited to apologize to the patrol chief and to the other cosmonauts, but he again refused. He was dismissed, never having completed a space mission.

=== Post-dismissal ===
Following dismissal he went back to flying interceptors in the Far East but fell to drinking and depression. He died on February 18, 1966. While drunk, he stepped in front of a train near the Ippolitovka station of the Far Eastern Railway, northwest of Vladivostok. It was officially ruled a suicide. To protect the image of the space program, efforts were made to cover up the reason for Nelyubov's dismissal and his following suicide. His image was airbrushed out of the "Sochi Six" photo which showed the top members of the original class of Soviet cosmonauts. This airbrushing led to speculation about "lost cosmonauts".

=== Legacy ===
In 2007, an award-winning TV documentary about him was released.
