= Valentin Filatyev =

Soviet air officer and cosmonaut candidate

Valentin Filatyev Валентин Филатьев
- Born: 21 January 1930; Malinovka, Ishimsky District, USSR
- Died: 15 September 1990 (aged 60) Oryol, USSR
- Allegiance: Soviet Union
- Branch: Soviet Air Force
- Rank: Major
- Spouse: Larissa

Valentin Ignatyevich Filatyev (Russian: Валентин Игнатьевич Филатьев; 21 January 1930 – 15 September 1990) was a Soviet cosmonaut who was dismissed from the Soviet space program for disciplinary reasons. He attended the Stalingrad HAF pilots School, graduating in 1955, and served as a fighter pilot in the Air Defense Force.

== Early life ==
He was one of five children, raised amidst the World War II, which claimed the lives of his father, Ignatius and two brothers. Filatyev attended the Shablyninsky secondary school in his hometown of Malinovka, Tyumen Region, Russia, in 1938. He was affectionately known as Valya to his family and friends. After completing his education at Shablyninsky secondary school, he pursued a career in teaching, graduating from Ishimsk State Pedagogical Institute in 1951.

== Career ==
Filatyev entered the armed services upon graduation and was selected for flying lessons at the Stalingrad (Kacha) Higher Air Force School for pilots. On November 29, 1955, he was awarded the rank of lieutenant in the Soviet Air Force. On January 11, 1956, Filatyev began full-time service in the Soviet Air Force as a pilot with the 472nd fighter regiment (IAP) of the 15th Anti-Aircraft Defence Force, flying in defense of the city of Orel. On December 15, 1956, he transferred to the 3rd IAP of the same air defense division, and one year later, on December 12, 1957, he was further promoted to senior lieutenant. The following day, December 13, 1957, he was promoted to the position of chief pilot within his regiment. He was married to Larissa.

Senior Lieutenant Filatyev, aged 30, was selected as one of the original 20 cosmonauts on 7 March 1960 along with Yuri Gagarin.

On 27 March 1963, Filatyev, Grigory Nelyubov and Ivan Anikeyev resisted while being arrested for drunk and disorderly conduct by the military patrol at Chkalovsky station. According to reports, the officers of the patrol were willing to dismiss the incident if the cosmonauts apologized; Filatyev and Anikeyev agreed but Nelyubov refused, and the matter was reported to the authorities. Because there had been previous incidents, all three were dismissed from the cosmonaut corps on 17 April 1963, though officially not until 4 May 1963. Filatyev never went on a space mission and following his dismissal, he eventually became a teacher.

To protect the image of the space program, efforts were made to cover up the reason for Filatyev's dismissal. His image was airbrushed out of cosmonaut photos and consequently this airbrushing led to speculation about "lost cosmonauts".
