= Ivan Anikeyev =

Soviet cosmonaut candidate

- Иван Аникеев
- Born: 12 February 1933; Soviet Union
- Died: 8 August 1992 (aged 59)
- Space career

Soviet Cosmonaut
- Selection: Air Force Group 1
- Missions: None

Ivan Nikolayevich Anikeyev (Russian: Иван Николаевич Аникеев; 12 February 1933 – 8 August 1992) was a Soviet cosmonaut who was dismissed from the Soviet space program for disciplinary reasons.

Senior Lieutenant Anikeyev was selected as one of the original 20 cosmonauts on 7 March 1960 along with Yuri Gagarin.

On 27 March 1963 Anikeyev, Grigory Nelyubov and Valentin Filatyev resisted while being arrested for drunk and disorderly conduct by the military patrol at Chkalovsky station. According to reports, the officers of the patrol were willing to dismiss the incident if the cosmonauts apologized; Anikeyev and Filatyev agreed but Nelyubov refused, and the matter was reported to the authorities. Because there had been previous incidents, all three were dismissed from the cosmonaut corps on 17 April 1963, though officially not until 4 May 1963. Anikeyev never completed a space mission.

To protect the image of the space program, efforts were made to cover up the reason for Anikeyev's dismissal. His image was airbrushed out of cosmonaut photos. This airbrushing led to speculation about "lost cosmonauts" even though the actual reasons were often mundane.

Alexei Leonov recounts that years later, while Anikeyev was at a party one night, someone stole his keys from his pocket and stole his car. The thief hit and killed a pedestrian, and to avoid responsibility, returned the keys to Anikeyev's pocket. The latter was sent to prison for a year before authorities realized he was innocent and released him, but he was never given the chance to fly again.
