= Korabl-Sputnik 1 =

Soviet spacecraft

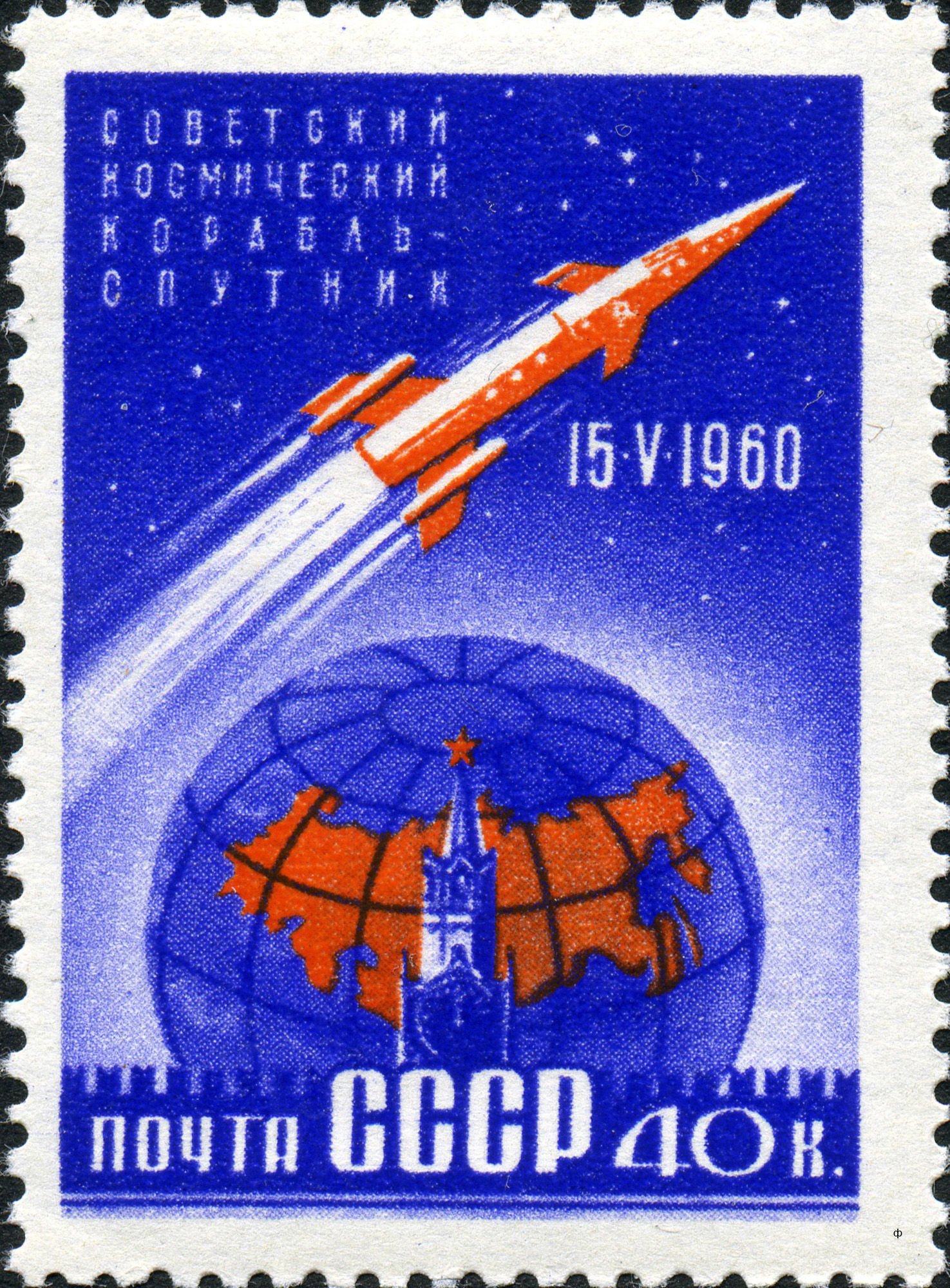
- The Korabl-Sputnik 1 rocket depicted on a 1960 stamp
- Names: Sputnik 4
- Mission type: Technology
- Operator: Soviet space program
- Harvard designation: 1960 Epsilon 3
- COSPAR ID: 1960-005A
- SATCAT no.: 36
- Mission duration: 4 days

Spacecraft properties
- Spacecraft type: Vostok-1P
- Manufacturer: OKB-1
- Launch mass: 4,540 kilograms (10,010 lb)

Start of mission
- Launch date: 15 May 1960, 00:00:05 UTC
- Rocket: Vostok-L 8K72
- Launch site: Baikonur 1/5

End of mission
- Disposal: Failed deorbit c. 19 May 1960
- Decay date: 5 September 1962
- Landing site: 44.098951°N 87.657689°W

Orbital parameters
- Reference system: Geocentric
- Regime: Low Earth
- Eccentricity: 0.02879
- Perigee altitude: 290 kilometres (160 nmi)
- Apogee altitude: 675 kilometres (364 nmi)
- Inclination: 65.02 degrees
- Period: 94.25 minutes
- Epoch: 1960-05-15 00:00:00 UTC

Korabl-Sputnik 1 (Russian: Корабль Спутник 1 meaning Vessel Satellite 1), also known as Sputnik 4 in the West, was the first test flight of the Soviet Vostok programme, and the first Vostok spacecraft. It was launched on May 15, 1960. Though Korabl-Sputnik 1 was uncrewed, it was a precursor to the first human spaceflight, Vostok 1. Its mass was 4,540 kilograms (10,010 lb), of which 1,477 kilograms (3,256 lb) was instrumentation.

The spacecraft, the first of a series of spacecraft used to investigate the means for crewed space flight, contained scientific instruments, a television system, and a self-sustaining biological cabin with a dummy of a man. It was designed to study the operation of the life support system and the stresses of flight. The spacecraft radioed both extensive telemetry and prerecorded voice communications. After four days of flight, the retro rocket was fired and the descent module was separated from its equipment module, but because the spacecraft was not in the correct flight attitude when its retro fired, the descent module did not reenter the atmosphere as planned.

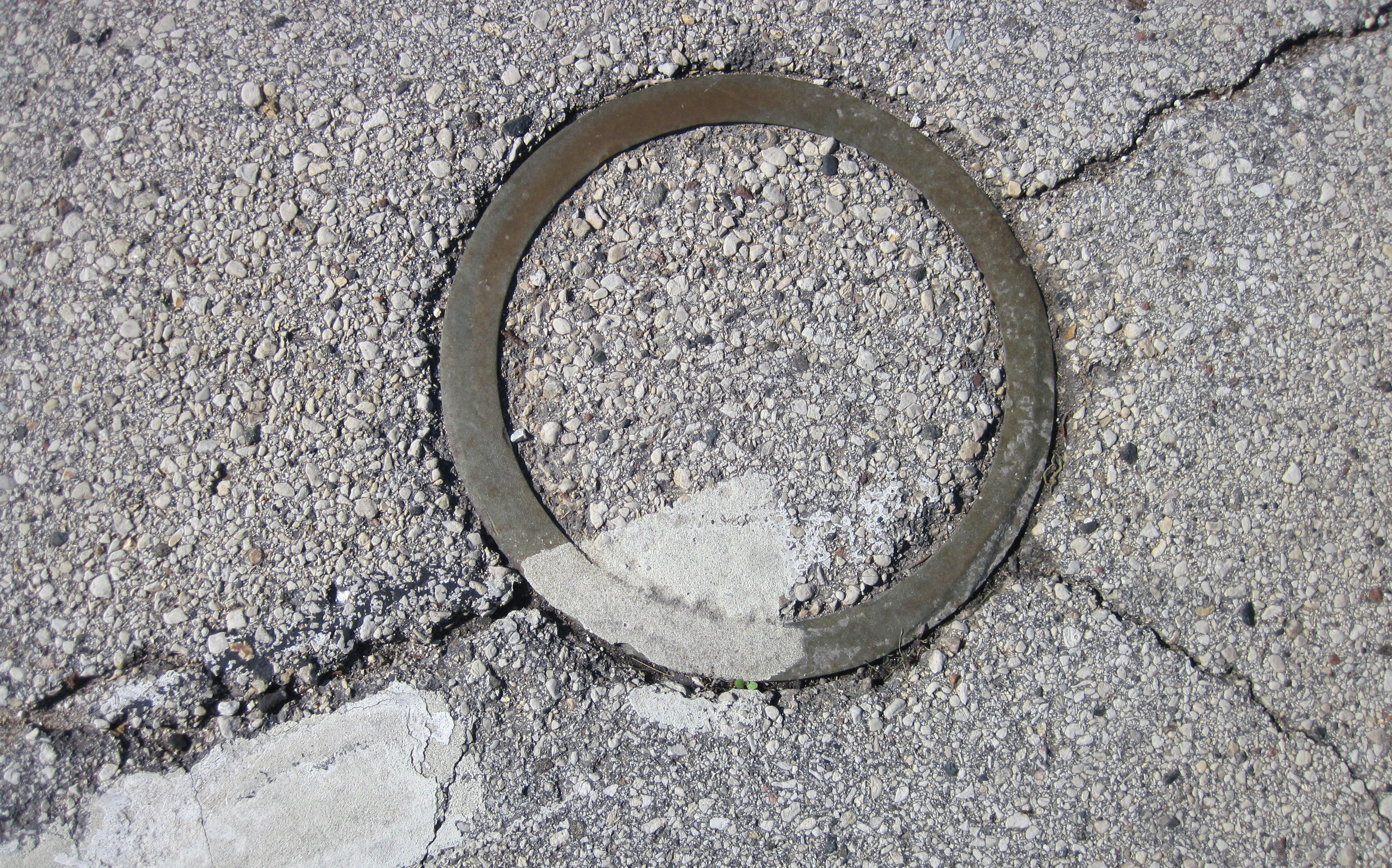
Ring marking the location of the impact in Manitowoc, Wisconsin.

The descent module re-entered the atmosphere on September 5, 1962, while the equipment module re-entered on October 15, 1965. A 20-pound piece of the descent module landed in Manitowoc, Wisconsin in the northern United States.

Giovanni Battista Judica Cordiglia, who set up his own amateur listening station at Torre Bert near Turin, is reported to have claimed that radio signals were received on November 28, 1960, which could have originated from this spacecraft; the spacecraft is known to have radioed prerecorded voice communications. It has led some to believe a conspiracy theory that the spacecraft may have been crewed by one of the Lost Cosmonauts.

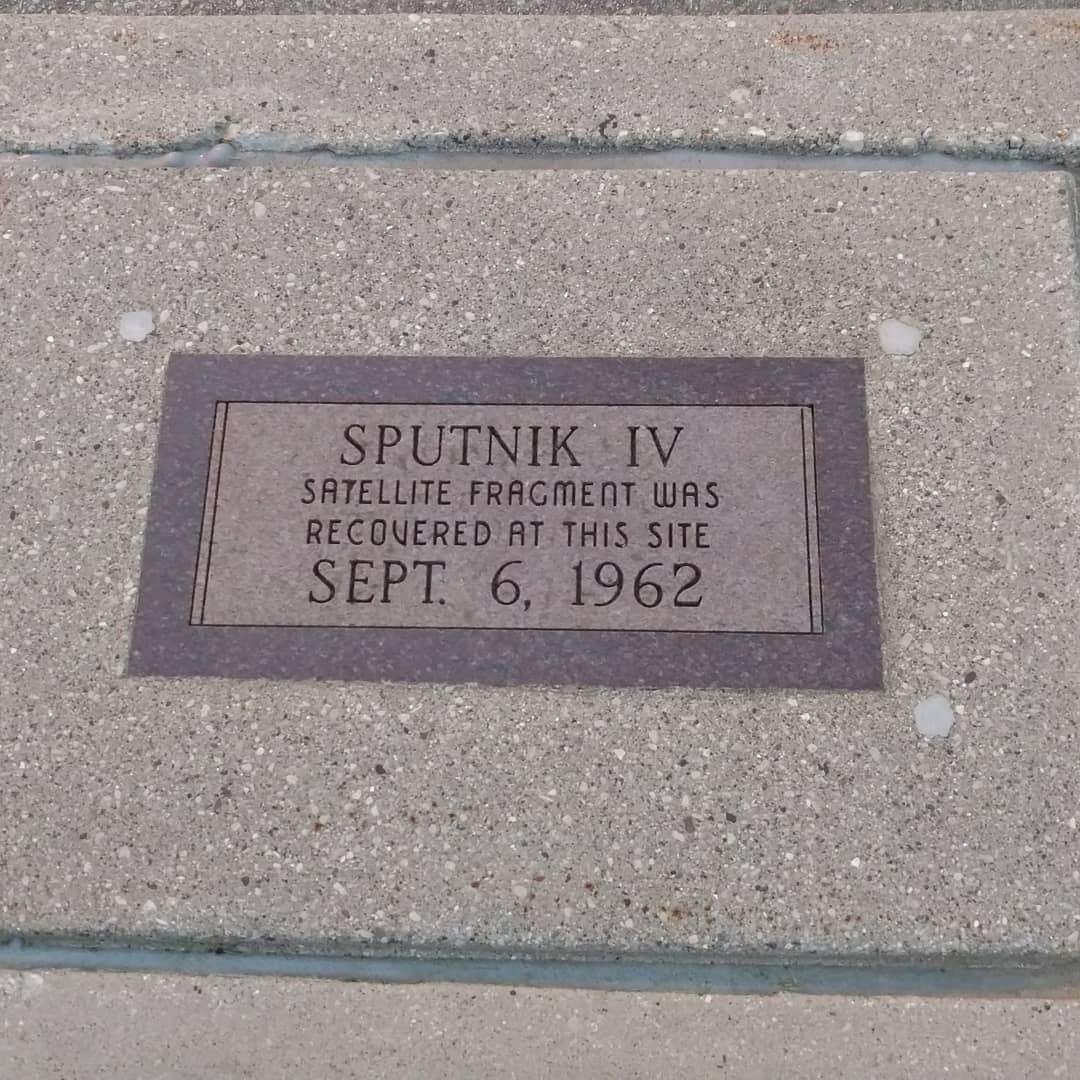
Historical marker on the sidewalk, adjacent to the location of where the Sputnik IV fragment was recovered that is marked by the ring in the roadway
