= Valentin Bondarenko =

Soviet fighter pilot and cosmonaut candidate (1937–1961)

- Валентин Бондаренко
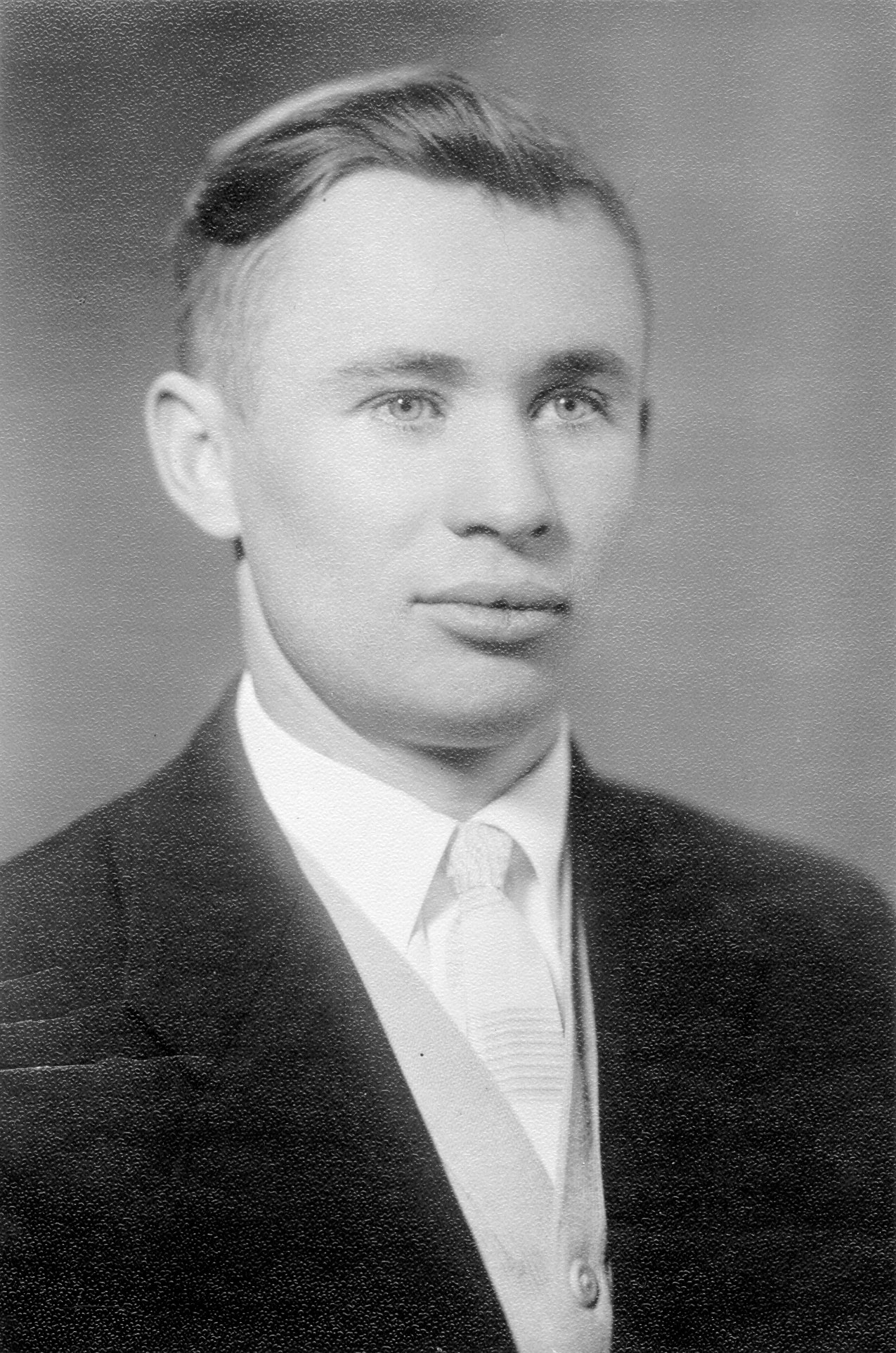
- Born: Valentin Vasilyevich Bondarenko; 16 February 1937; Kharkiv, Ukrainian SSR, Soviet Union
- Died: 23 March 1961 (aged 24); Moscow, Russian SFSR, Soviet Union
- Occupations: Pilot, Cosmonaut
- Awards: Order of the Red Star
- Space career

Cosmonaut
- Rank: Senior lieutenant, Soviet Air Forces
- Selection: Soviet Air Force Group 1

Valentin Vasilyevich Bondarenko (Russian: Валентин Васильевич Бондаренко; Ukrainian: Валентин Васильович Бондаренко; 16 February 1937 – 23 March 1961) was a Soviet fighter pilot selected in 1960 for training as a cosmonaut. He died as the result of burns sustained in a fire during a 15-day low-pressure endurance experiment in Moscow. The Soviet government concealed the death, along with Bondarenko's membership in the cosmonaut corps, until 1980. A crater on the Moon's far side is named after him.

== Education and military training ==
Bondarenko was born in Kharkiv, Ukrainian SSR, Soviet Union. His father was sent to the Eastern Front in the first days of World War II. The youngster and his mother went through several years of hardship during the war.

Bondarenko's father volunteering to fight in the Soviet Army instilled the idea of military training into Bondarenko at a young age, leading to his later interest in the Air Force.

From an early age, Bondarenko was fascinated by aviation heroes and dreamed of becoming a military aviator himself. While still at Kharkiv's Higher Air Force School, he was a member of the local aviation club. After Bondarenko's graduation in 1954, he was admitted to the Voroshilovgrad Aviation Military Academy and a year later, he was transferred to an Air Force College in Grozny, Armavir Military Pilot Aviation School, from which he graduated in 1957. In 1956, he married Galina Semenovna Rykova, a medical worker. Their first child was born later that year. During 1956, Bondarenko was sent to Armavir Higher Air Force Pilots School, graduating in 1957—the same year Sputnik 1 was launched.

Bondarenko was commissioned a Second Lieutenant, and served in the Soviet Air Force's PribVO (the former Baltic Military District). He was promoted to Senior Lieutenant in December 1959.

== Selection for cosmonaut training ==
On 28 April 1960, Bondarenko was chosen to be among the first group of 20 cosmonauts. Bondarenko, "(also known as 'Valentin Junior' and 'Tinkerbell') was the youngest member of the cosmonaut team." He began training on 31 May for a planned launch on the crewed Vostok spacecraft. According to his fellow cosmonauts, Bondarenko was a mild-mannered person with a pleasant disposition. He had a good singing voice and played table tennis well.

== Death ==
23 March 1961 was the tenth day of a 15-day endurance experiment in a low-pressure altitude chamber at the Institute of Biomedical Problems in Moscow. The chamber's atmosphere was at least 50% oxygen. Bondarenko, having completed work for the day, removed monitoring biosensors from his body and washed his skin with an alcohol-soaked cotton ball, which he then discarded. The cotton ball landed on an electric hot plate which he was using to brew a cup of tea. The cotton ignited and Bondarenko tried to smother the flames with the sleeve of his woolen coveralls, which caught fire in the chamber's oxygen-rich atmosphere.

Because of the pressure difference, it took an onlooking doctor nearly half an hour to open the chamber door. Bondarenko's clothing burned until almost all the oxygen in the chamber was used up and he had suffered third-degree burns over most of his body, as well as losing both of his eyes. All Bondarenko could offer in response was "It's my fault...I'm so sorry...no one else is to blame."

The attending physician at Botkin Hospital, surgeon and traumatologist Vladimir Golyakhovsky, recalled in 1984 that while attempting to start an intravenous drip, the only blood vessels he could find for inserting a needle were on the soles of Bondarenko's feet, where his flight boots had warded off the flames. According to Golyakhovsky, cosmonaut Yuri Gagarin spent several hours at the hospital as "deathwatch officer". Bondarenko died of shock 16 hours after the accident, less than three weeks before Gagarin's first spaceflight aboard Vostok 1. Manned orbital flight program director Nikolai Kamanin blamed Bondarenko's death on the Institute's poor organisation and control of the experiment.

Bondarenko was buried in Lipovaya Roshcha in Kharkiv, where his parents were then living. On 17 June 1961, the Presidium of the Supreme Soviet posthumously awarded Bondarenko the Order of the Red Star.

== Aftermath ==
News of Bondarenko's accident and death was not published at the time. Bondarenko had already appeared in group films and photos of the first cosmonaut group, and his unexplained disappearance sparked rumours of cosmonauts dying in failed launches. In 1980, the details of this incident were at last published in the West, and in 1986, Izvestia published an article by science writer Yaroslav Golovanov, detailing the incident for Soviet readers.

James Oberg, in his book Red Star in Orbit, wrote how the Soviet government airbrushed out the cosmonaut's image from an official 1961 photograph of the first six cosmonauts selected for training, while British researcher Rex Hall showed that five people had been erased from an earlier group photograph of 16 cosmonauts. Clumsy attempts were later made to further doctor the historic photographs, with the insertion of imaginative but nonexistent photo details to account for the absence of the original members of the group. There are hardly any documents available depicting Bondarenko's life, an attempt from the Soviet Union to erase Bondarenko.

Bondarenko's death was caused by fire in a sealed, high-oxygen environment, which also befell the crew of Apollo 1. By 1966, the lethal hazards of a high-pressure 100-percent-oxygen environment such as Apollo 1's had been thoroughly described in American scientific publications and were well known to NASA.

In 1971, the crew of Apollo 15 placed a plaque on the moon dedicated to the fallen astronauts. Valentin Bondarenko's name was not on the plaque as his death had not been revealed at the time.

== Books ==
An account of Bondarenko's life appears in the 2003 book Fallen Astronauts: Heroes Who Died Reaching for the Moon by Colin Burgess.
