= Paul Jones (Navajo chairman) =

Paul Jones (October 27, 1895 – November 7, 1971) was an elected chairman of the Navajo Tribal Council in 1955 and re-elected in 1959. On March 4, 1963 he was defeated by Raymond Nakai.

== Sources ==
- Lafarge, Oliver. (MCMLVI). A Pictorial History of the American Indian. Crown Publishers Inc. Page 235.
- "Long 'Sleep' Ends For U.S. Navajos", Calgary Herald, December 7, 1960
- Paul Jones' obituary in The Deseret News, November 10, 1971
