= Bondarenko (crater) =

Lunar impact crater

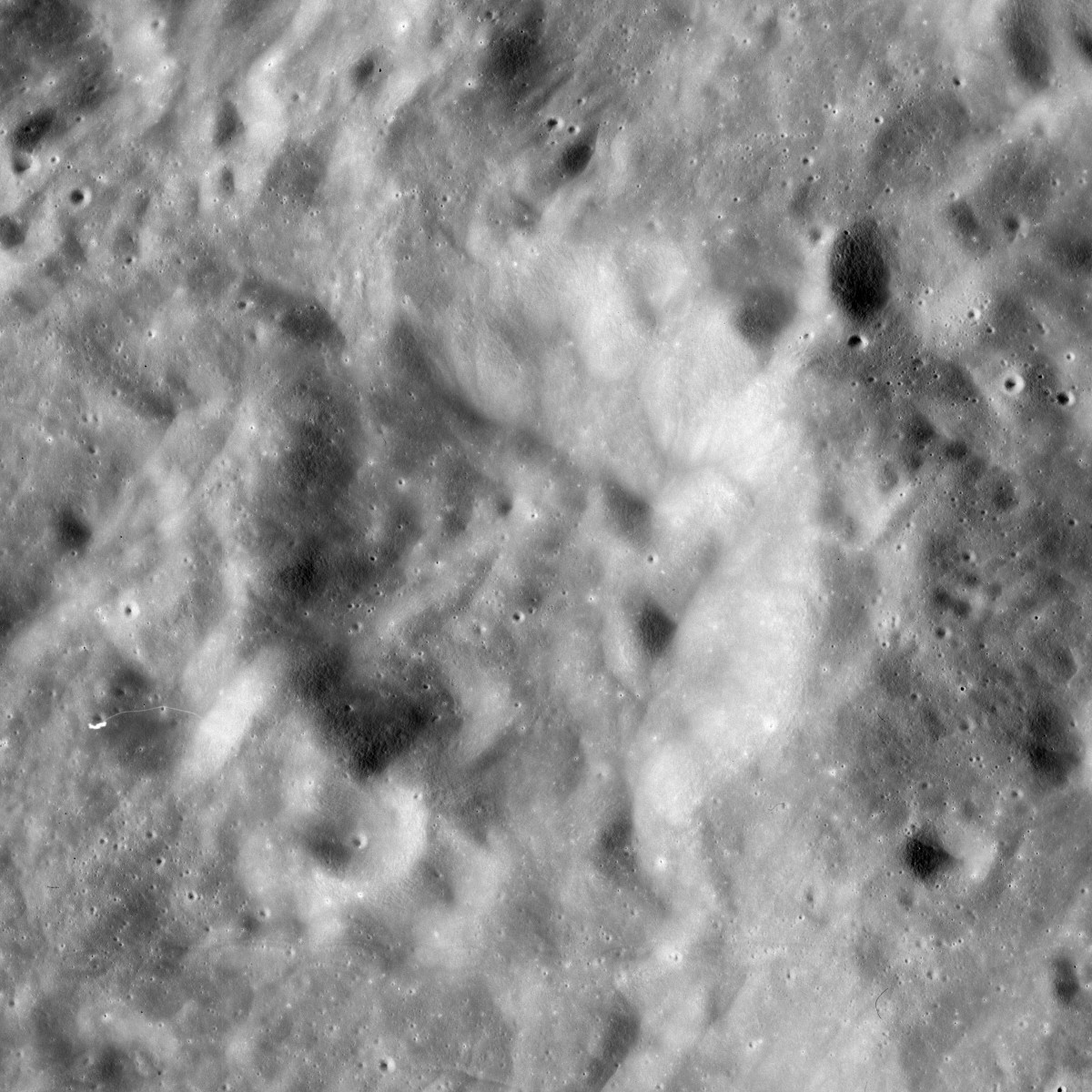
- Apollo 15 Mapping Camera image
- Coordinates: 17.24°S 136.89°E
- Diameter: 28.26 km (17.56 mi)
- Depth: Unknown
- Colongitude: 224° at sunrise
- Eponym: Valentin Bondarenko

Bondarenko is a lunar impact crater on the far side of the Moon. It is located to the northeast of the large, dark-floored crater Tsiolkovskiy, and south of the crater Chauvenet. This is a worn crater formation with an irregular floor, similar to other craters in the area, which are covered by ejecta from Tsiolkovskiy.

Formerly known as Patsaev G, it is named for Soviet student-cosmonaut Valentin Bondarenko (1937–1961), who was killed in a training simulator accident. Its designation was officially adopted by the International Astronomical Union in 1991. Patsaev itself is to the west of Bondarenko.
