= Église Saint-Germain, Royère-de-Vassivière =

Église Saint-Germain de Royère-de-Vassivière
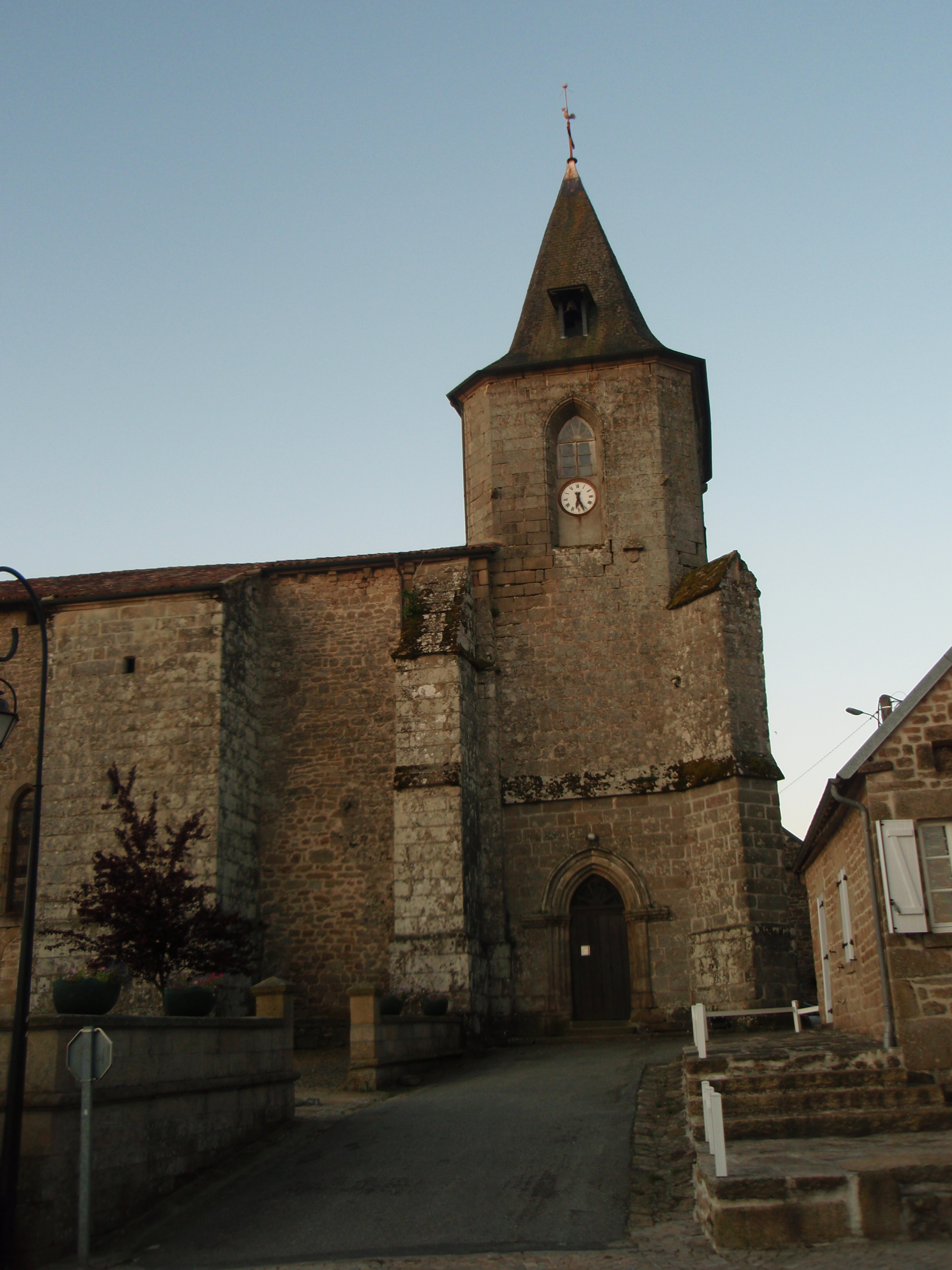
- Facade of the church

Religion
- Affiliation: Roman Catholic

Location
- Location: Royère-de-Vassivière, France
- Interactive map of Église Saint-Germain de Royère-de-Vassivière
- Coordinates: 45.84194°N 1.91194°E

Architecture
- Type: Church
- Style: Gothic
- Completed: 14th century

The Église Saint-Germain de Royère-de-Vassivière is a Gothic church built in Royère-de-Vassivière in the department of Creuse and region of Nouvelle-Aquitaine. The church was included in the inventory of monuments historiques on 9 March 1963.

The patron of the church is Saint-Germain who was born in Autun in 496. He founded with Merovingian king Childebert I, son of Clovis, the church of Saint Vincent which became the church of Saint-Germain-des-Prés. He was also the twentieth bishop of Paris. The church has a single nave with flat apse.

== History ==
The current building was built in the late 13th century, or rather of the 14th century. Its porch and its tower seem to have been constructed in the 15th century. A community of religious brothers served the church since 1491.

Before 1776, Royère-de-Vassivière had several places of burial. From 1776, burials in the church were forbidden, for hygiene reasons, by a Royal Declaration, except for the priests. In Royère, this declaration was immediately respected and the last profane burial was that of Marie Lenoir in 1774. In 1779, it was decided to move the cemetery beside the Église Saint-Germain to the outside of the town. The new cemetery was eventually opened in 1856. The old cemetery was replaced by a square under the Mayor M. Toumieux administration. The War memorial of the city is now on the square.

== Gallery ==
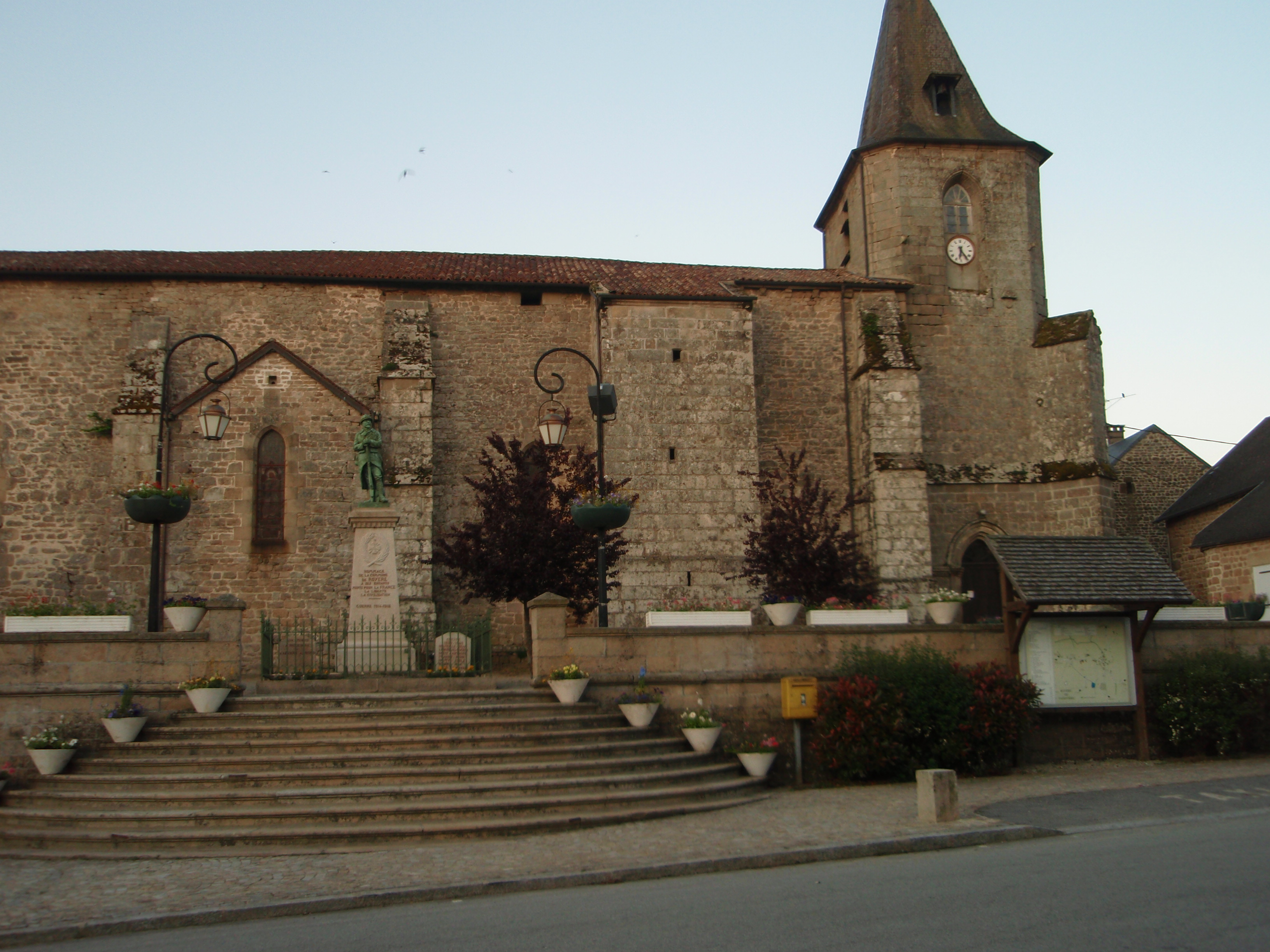
On the new square, there is the War memorial

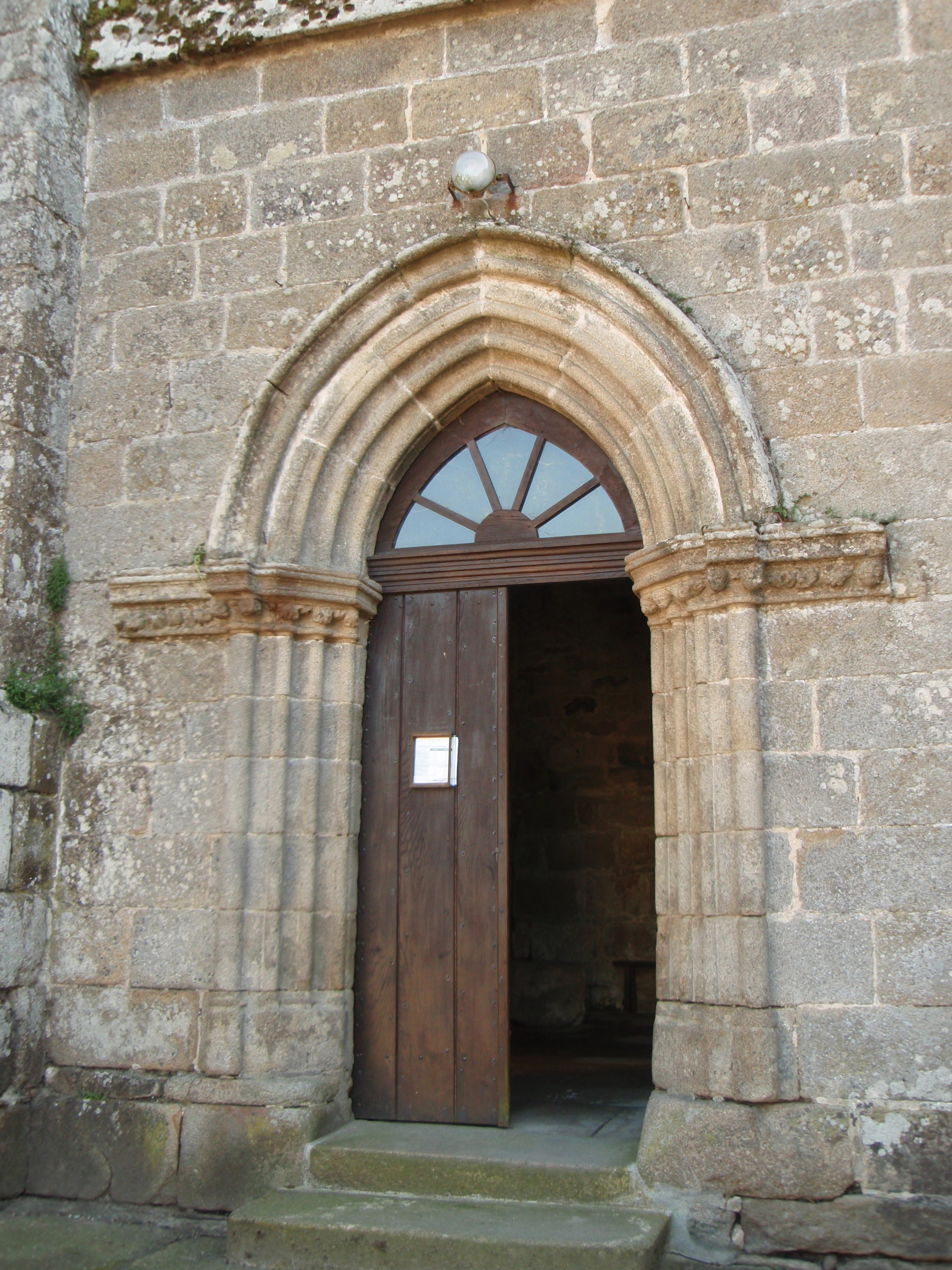
Entry of the Église Saint-Germain de Royère-de-Vassivière

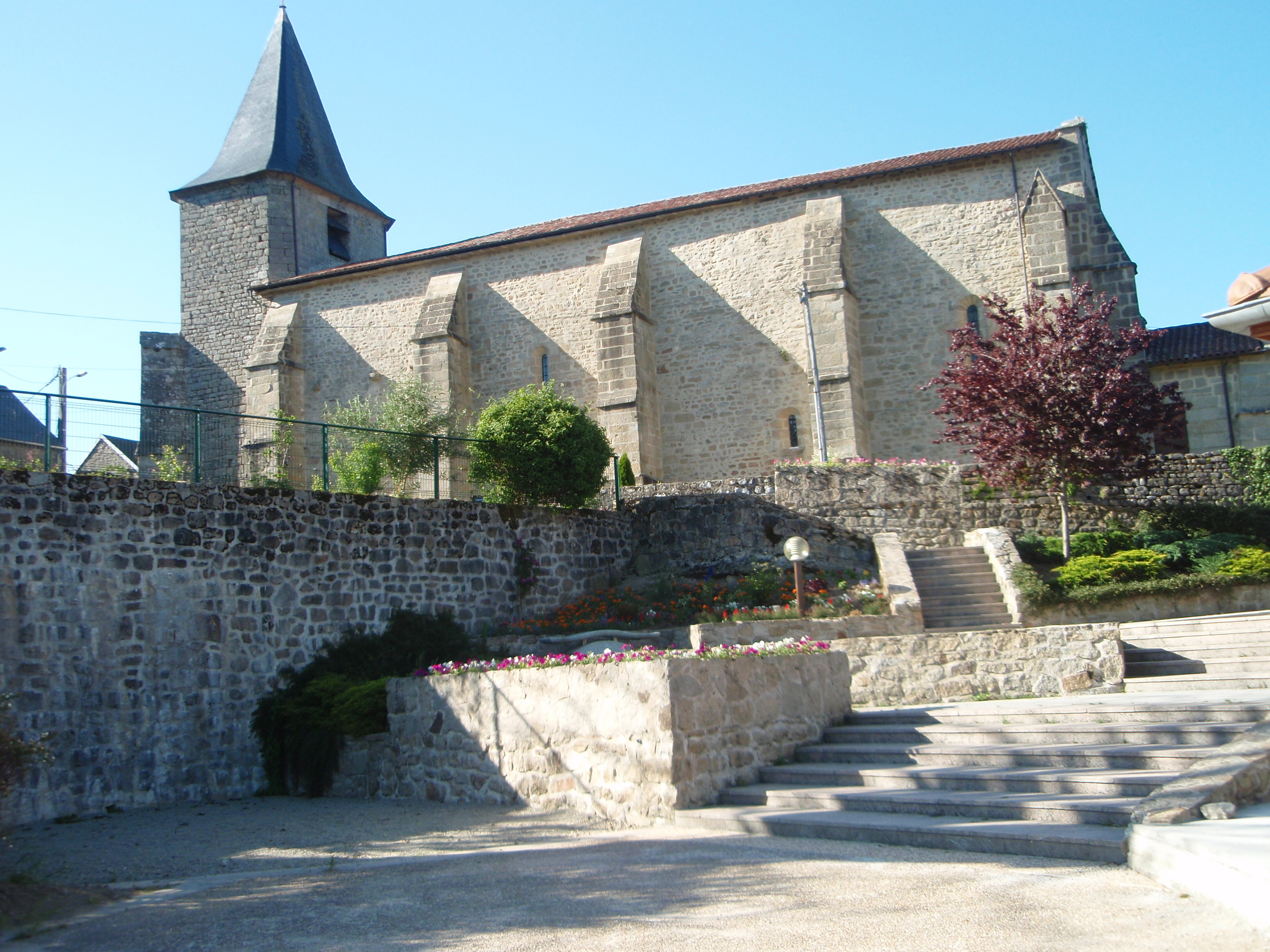
Église Saint-Germain de Royère-de-Vassivière, back facade

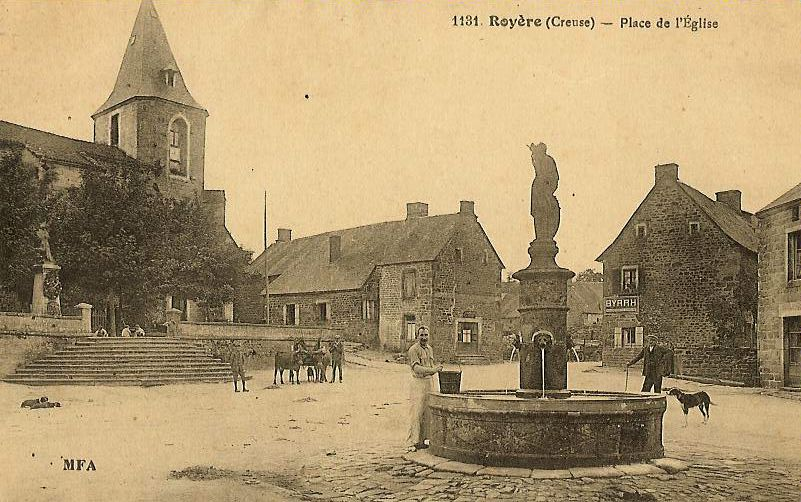
Place de la Mayade, in Royere, in 1131
