= Judica-Cordiglia brothers =

Italian radio hobbyists who claimed to have recorded covered up Soviet space missions

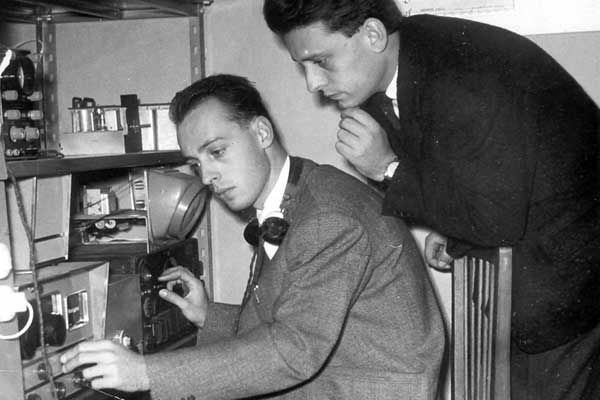
The two brothers

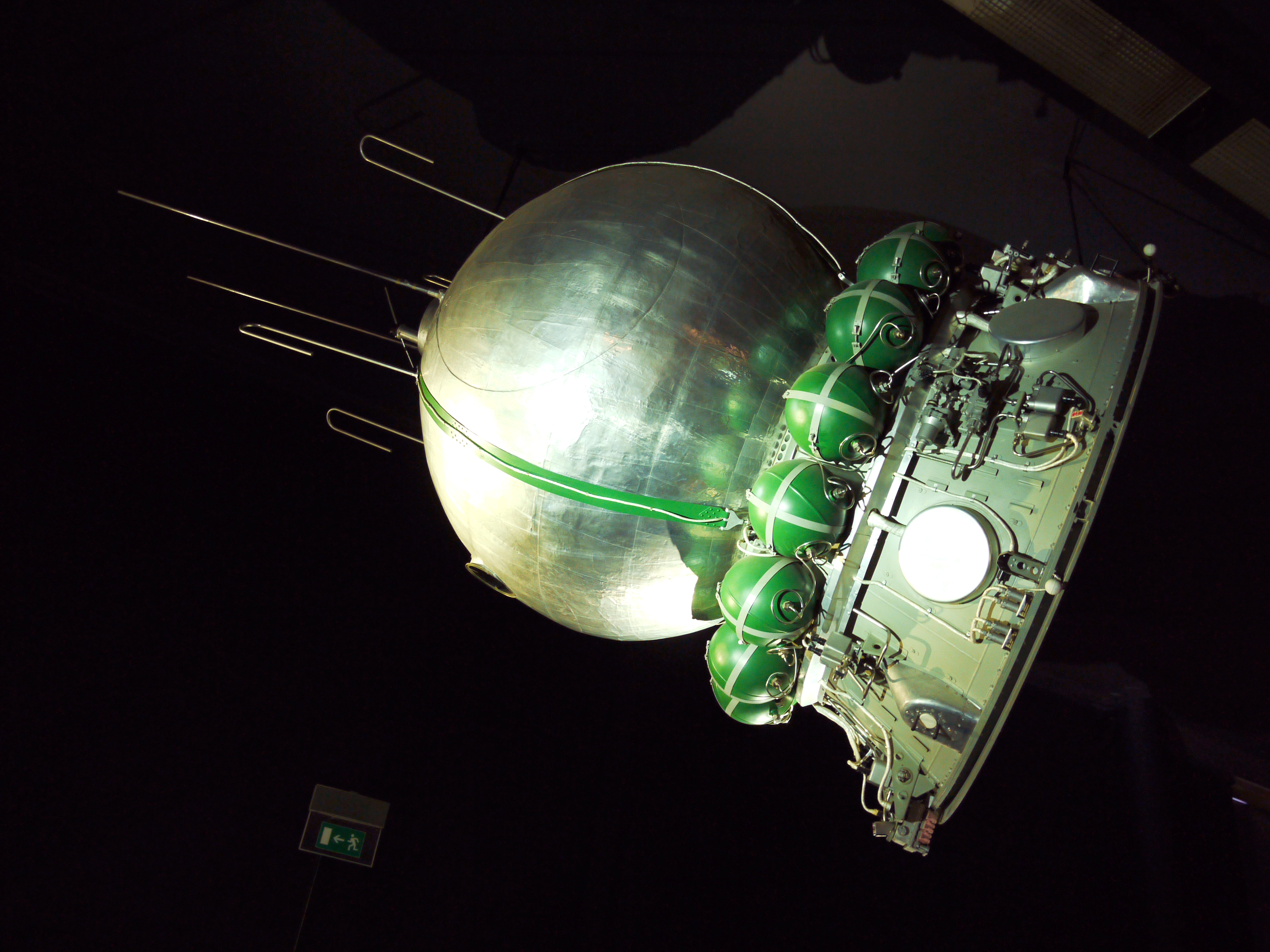
The brothers reported that they had recorded messages from secret missions during the Soviet Vostok program in the early 1960s.

The Judica-Cordiglia brothers were two Italian amateur radio operators who made audio recordings which are often regarded as evidence by supporters of the conspiracy theory that the Soviet space program covered up cosmonaut deaths in the 1960s. The pair claimed to have recorded communications from several failed secret Soviet space missions. These recordings have been a subject of public interest for more than 50 years.

== Background ==
Achille (1933–2015) and his brother Giovanni Battista (1939–2024) set up their own experimental listening station just outside Turin in the late 1950s. The brothers used a disused German bunker at a site named Torre Bert. Working with scavenged and improvised equipment, they claimed to have successfully monitored transmissions from the Soviet Sputnik program (1 & 2) and Explorer 1, the first American satellite, in 1958 using equipment that recorded flight information such as telemetry, voice recordings and visual data.

== Recordings ==
In the 1960s, the brothers released recordings alleged to be radio communications taken from secret Soviet Union space missions, including the purported dying sounds of a suffocating lost cosmonaut. As compiled by Kris Hollington of the Fortean Times, a British monthly magazine that popularizes "anomalous phenomena", the quoted list of these is as follows:

May 1960 Unnamed cosmonaut lost when his orbiting space capsule veered off course.

28th November 1960 The brothers picked up a faint SOS message in Morse code from a troubled spacecraft. The craft was purportedly on an escape trajectory out of Earth's sphere of influence.

February 1961 Recorded the heavy breathing and the rapid heartbeat of a suffocating cosmonaut.

April 1961 Just prior to Yuri Gagarin’s flight, a capsule circled the Earth three times before re-entering the Earth’s atmosphere.

May 1961 Weak calls for help from an orbiting capsule.

October 1961 A Soviet spacecraft veered off course and vanished into deep space.

November 1962 A space capsule bounced off the Earth’s atmosphere during re-entry and disappeared.

May 1963 Unnamed female cosmonaut perished on re-entry.

April 1964 Cosmonaut lost when capsule burnt up on re-entry.

The most well-known "lost cosmonaut" recording was taken on May 23, 1963. In it, a purported cosmonaut frantically communicates her distress as her spacecraft burns up in the atmosphere:

I CAN SEE A FLAME!… I CAN SEE A FLAME!…

I FEEL HOT… I FEEL HOT… THIRTYTWO…

THIRTYTWO… FORTYONE… FORTYONE

AM I GOING TO CRASH?… YES…YES… I FEEL HOT!…

I FEEL HOT!… I WILL REENTER!… I WILL REENTER…

I AM LISTENING!… I FEEL HOT!…

Notably, the cosmonaut doesn't use formal communication protocols, casting doubt on the authenticity of the recording.

== Skepticism over the recordings ==
There have been inconsistencies in the recordings. For instance, audio transcripts reveal that none of the cosmonauts, who were supposed to be Soviet air force pilots, followed standard communication protocols, such as identifying themselves when speaking or using correct technical terminology. Likewise, some of the recordings contain disjointed sentences and grammatical errors, and the speaker has an accent that does not sound Russian. Given the secrecy surrounding the Soviet space program at the time, the US intelligence community considered the claims plausible, but subsequent mass declassification of Soviet documents provided no evidence for the existence of the Lost Cosmonauts.

== Legacy ==
Fortean Times published an article on the brothers and their recordings of lost cosmonauts in March 2008.

In 2011, the brothers' story was featured on the Science Channel TV show, Dark Matters: Twisted But True.

In March 2020, Giovanni Battista was interviewed by Vice regarding the brothers' story on the Extremes podcast Season 2 Episode 25 titled "Mystery of the Lost Cosmonauts". It was also featured on a Vice article titled "These Brothers Were Eavesdropping on Space Transmissions When They Heard Cries for Help", as an accompaniment to the podcast episode.

The 2024 Apple TV+ series Constellation includes recordings of a lost female cosmonaut as a major plot point, and recreates the brothers' alleged 1961 recording.

== See also ==
- Escape velocity
