= Lost Cosmonauts =

Conspiracy theory about Soviet cosmonauts

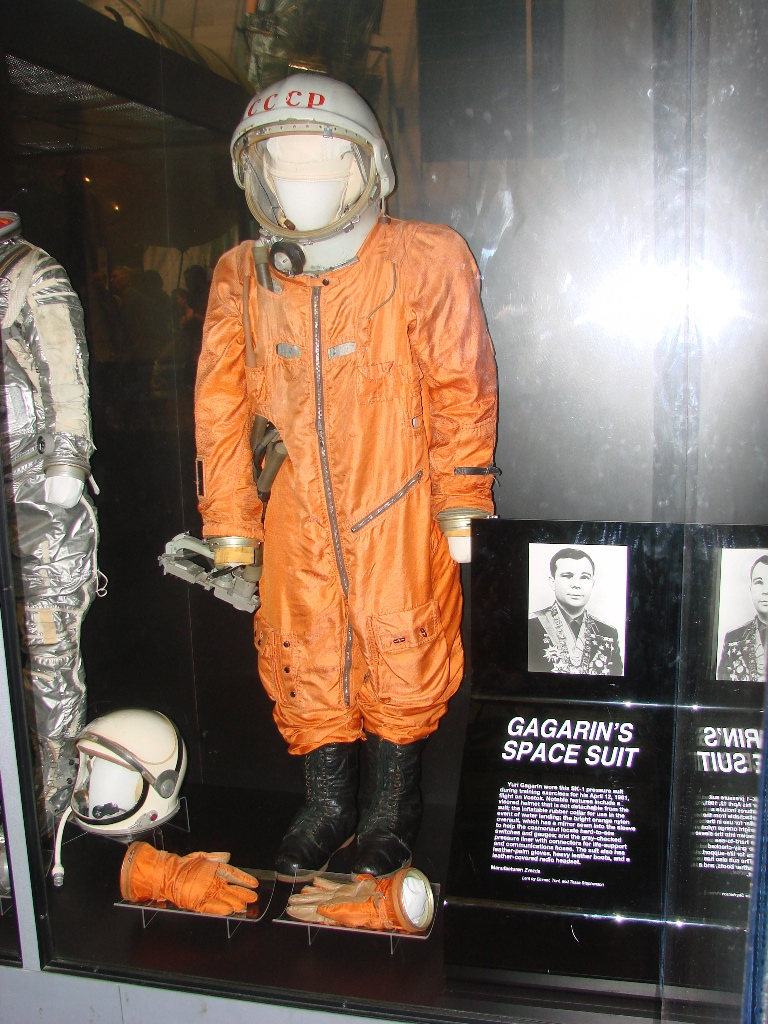
The SK-1 spacesuit worn by the first cosmonauts.

The Lost Cosmonauts or Phantom Cosmonauts are subjects of a conspiracy theory, which alleges that Soviet and Russian space authorities have concealed the deaths of some cosmonauts in outer space. Proponents of the Lost Cosmonauts theory argue that the Soviet Union attempted to launch human spaceflights before Yuri Gagarin's first spaceflight (Vostok 1, 1961), and that cosmonauts onboard died in those attempts. Soviet military pilot Vladimir Ilyushin was alleged to have landed off course and been held by the Chinese government. The Government of the Soviet Union supposedly suppressed this information, to prevent bad publicity during the height of the Cold War.

The evidence cited to support Lost Cosmonaut theories is generally regarded as inconclusive, and several cases have been confirmed as hoaxes. In the 1980s, American journalist James Oberg researched space-related disasters in the Soviet Union, but found no evidence of these Lost Cosmonauts. Since the fall of the Soviet Union in the early 1990s, much previously restricted information has been made available, including information on Valentin Bondarenko, a would-be cosmonaut, whose death during training on Earth was covered up by the Soviet government. Even with the availability of published Soviet archival material and memoirs of Russian space pioneers, no evidence has emerged to support the Lost Cosmonaut theories. Ilyushin, who died in 2010, also never gave any support to conspiracy theories.

== Allegations ==
=== Purported Czechoslovak information leak ===
In December 1959, an alleged high-ranking Czechoslovak Communist leaked information about many purported unofficial space shots. Alexei Ledovsky was mentioned as being launched inside a converted R-5A rocket. Three more names of alleged cosmonauts claimed to have perished under similar circumstances were Andrei Mitkov, Sergei Shiborin and Maria Gromova. In December 1959, the Italian news agency Continentale repeated the claims that a series of cosmonaut deaths on suborbital flights had been revealed by a high-ranking Czechoslovak communist. Continentale identified the cosmonauts as Alexei Ledowsky, Serenty Schriborin, Andrei Mitkow, and Maria Gromova. No other evidence of Soviet sub-orbital crewed flights ever came to light.

=== High-altitude equipment tests ===
A 1959 edition of Ogoniok published an article and photos of three high-altitude parachutists: Colonel Pyotr Dolgov, Ivan Kachur, and Alexey Grachov. Official records state that Dolgov was killed on November 1, 1962, while carrying out a high-altitude parachute jump from a Volga balloon gondola. Dolgov jumped at an altitude of 28,640 metres (93,960 ft). The helmet visor of Dolgov's Sokol space suit hit part of the gondola as he exited, depressurizing the suit and killing him. Kachur is known to have disappeared around this time; his name has become linked to this equipment. Grachov is thought to have been involved, with Dolgov and Kachur, in testing the high-altitude equipment. Russian journalist Yaroslav Golovanov suggested that high-altitude testing was exaggerated into a story that those parachutists died on a space flight. In late 1959, Ogoniok carried pictures of a man identified as Gennady Zavadovsky testing high-altitude equipment (perhaps with Grachov and others). Zavadovsky would later appear on lists of dead cosmonauts, without a date of death or accident description.

Yaroslav Golovanov, who researched the lost cosmonaut claims in his book, Cosmonaut #1, found and interviewed the real Alexey Timofeyevich Belokonov, a retired high-altitude parachutist. In this interview, Belokonov revealed more about his colleagues Dolgov, Kachur, Mikhailov, Grachov, Zavadovsky and Ilyushin, and confirmed they never flew to space. According to Belokonov, in 1963, after New York Journal American published an article on lost cosmonauts, listing the parachutists among them, Soviet newspapers Izvestia and Krasnaya Zvezda published a refutation that included testimonies and photographs of the actual parachutists Belokonov, Kachur, Grachov and Zavadovsky. The parachutists also wrote an angry letter to New York Journal American editor William Randolph Hearst, Jr., which he ignored.

=== Robert Heinlein's speculation ===
In 1960, the science fiction author Robert A. Heinlein wrote in his article Pravda means 'Truth' (reprinted in Expanded Universe) that on May 15, 1960, while traveling in Vilnius, in Soviet Lithuania, he was told by Red Army cadets that the Soviet Union had launched a human into orbit that day, but later the same day, it was denied by officials. Heinlein speculated that Korabl-Sputnik 1 was an orbital launch, later said to be uncrewed, and that the retro-rockets had fired in the wrong altitude, making recovery efforts unsuccessful.

According to Gagarin's biography, these rumours were likely started as a result of two Vostok missions equipped with dummies (including a mannequin known as Ivan Ivanovich) and human voice tape recordings (to test if the radio worked) that were made just prior to Gagarin's flight.

In a U.S. press conference on February 23, 1962, Colonel Barney Oldfield revealed that an uncrewed space capsule had indeed been orbiting the Earth since 1960, as it had become jammed into its booster rocket. According to the NASA NSSDC Master Catalog, Korabl Sputnik 1, designated at the time 1KP or Vostok 1P, did launch on May 15, 1960 (one year before Gagarin). It was a prototype of the later Zenit and Vostok launch vehicles. The onboard TDU (Braking Engine Unit) had ordered the retrorockets to fire to recover, but due to a malfunction of the attitude control system, the spacecraft was oriented upside-down, and the firing put the craft into a higher orbit. The re-entry capsule lacked a heat shield as there were no plans to recover it. Engineers had planned to use the vessel's telemetry data to determine if the guidance system had functioned correctly, so recovery was unnecessary.

=== The Torre Bert recordings ===
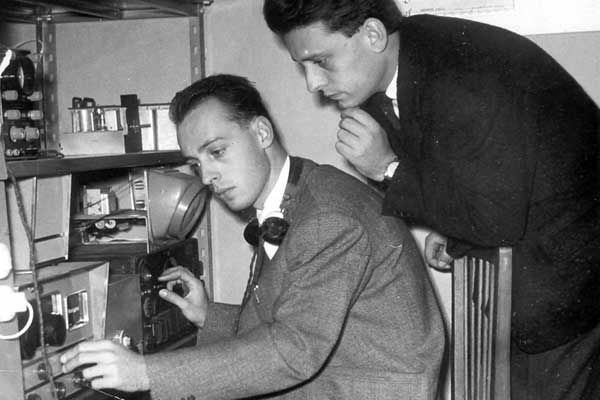
The two brothers

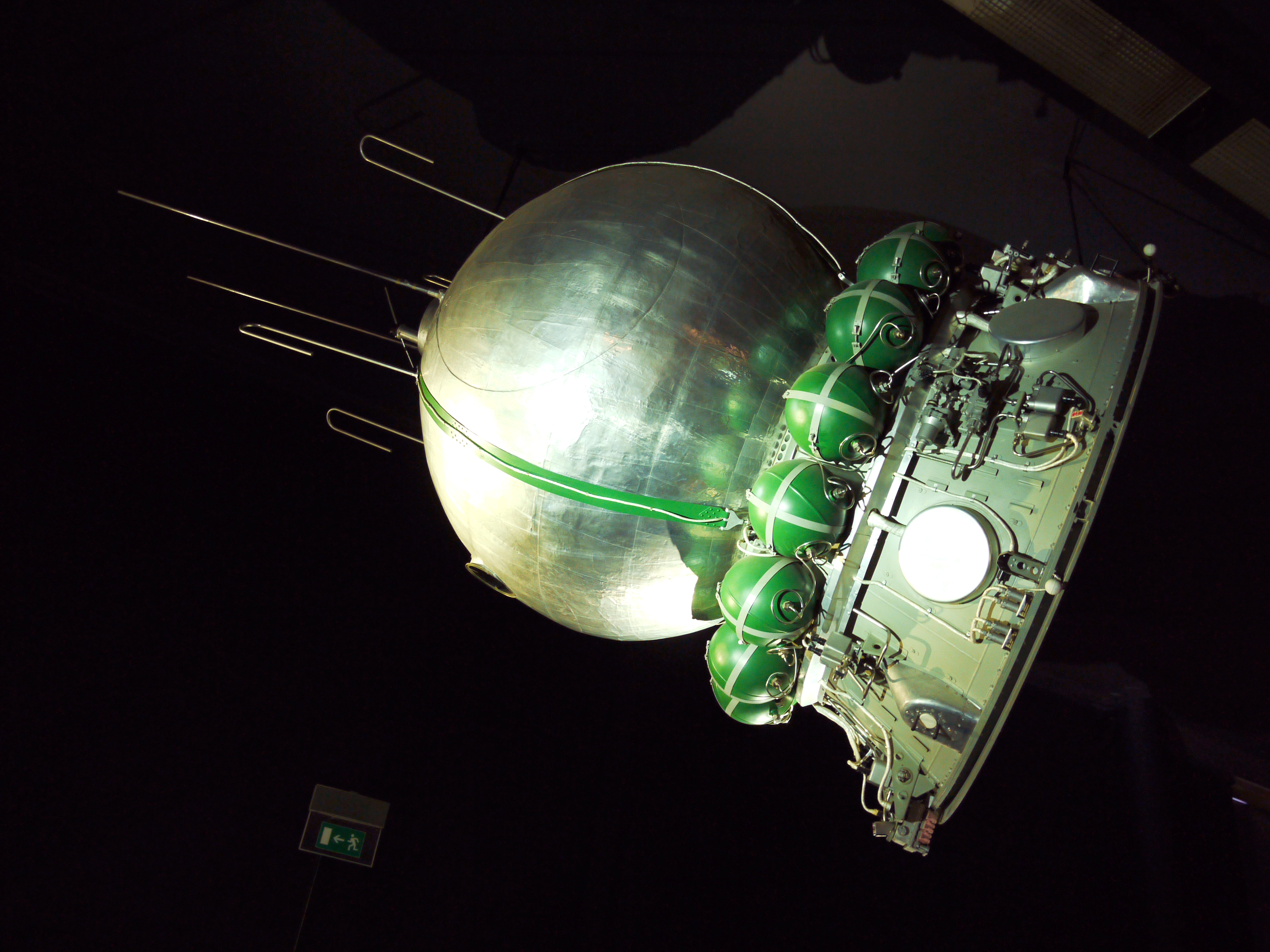
The brothers reported that they had recorded messages from secret missions during the Soviet Vostok program in the early 1960s.

The Judica-Cordiglia brothers were two Italian amateur radio operators who made audio recordings which are often regarded as evidence by supporters of the conspiracy theory that the Soviet space program covered up cosmonaut deaths in the 1960s. The pair claimed to have recorded communications from several failed secret Soviet space missions. These recordings have been a subject of public interest for more than 50 years.

=== Vladimir Ilyushin ===
On April 10, 1961, Dennis Odgen claimed that former test pilot Ilyushin's car crash accident was a cover story and that he went on a failed Vostok mission, but somehow survived.

=== Other allegations ===
In 1959, pioneering space theoretician Hermann Oberth claimed a pilot had been killed on a sub-orbital ballistic flight from Kapustin Yar in early 1958. He cited Italian media reports.

== Confirmed hoaxes ==
=== Ivan Istochnikov ===
Soyuz 2 was an uncrewed spacecraft that was the docking target for Soyuz 3. However, Mike Arena, an American journalist, claimed to have found in 1993 that an "Ivan Istochnikov" and his dog "Kloka", who were manning Soyuz 2, disappeared on October 26, 1968, with signs of having been hit by a meteorite. They had supposedly been "erased" from history by the Soviet authorities, who could not tolerate such a failure.

The entire story was found to be a hoax perpetrated by Joan Fontcuberta as a "modern art exercise" that included falsified mission artifacts, various digitally manipulated images, and immensely detailed feature-length biographies that turned out to be riddled with hundreds of historical, as well as technical, errors. The exhibit was shown in Madrid in 1997, and the National Museum of Catalan Art in 1998. Brown University later purchased several articles, and put them on display themselves.

Mexico's Luna Cornea magazine, however, failed to notice the hoax revelations, and ran issue number 14 (January/April 1998) with photos, and a story explaining the "truth".

Several lines of evidence available since the first "Sputnik Foundation" exhibition in 1997 in Madrid revealed that the story and artifacts form an elaborate hoax:

- The name "Ivan Istochnikov" is a Russian translation of Joan Fontcuberta's name; in specific, "Joan" and "Ivan" both translate to "John" and "Fontcuberta" and "Istochnikov" both mean "hidden fountain".
- The photographs of Istochnikov show Fontcuberta's face.
- Pages of the official website of the Madrid exhibition contain the words "PURE FICTION" toward the top of each page in light red text on a dark red background or light pink text on a white background.
- The front and rear endpapers of the catalog accompanying the Madrid exhibition have the words "it's all fiction" in Russian and Spanish printed on them using glow-in-the-dark ink.
- At the website of Spanish newspaper El Mundo, the third of three pages concerning the Madrid exhibition states that "the report which we published on the previous pages is a product of his [Fontcuberta's] imagination".

=== Andrei Mikoyan ===
Andrei Mikoyan was reportedly killed together with a second crew member in an attempt to reach the Moon ahead of the Americans in early 1969. Due to system malfunction, they supposedly failed to get into lunar orbit and shot past the Moon.

This story, which circulated in 2000, may have been based on the plot of an episode of the television series The Cape. The episode "Buried in Peace" first aired on October 28, 1996. In it, a Space Shuttle crew on a mission to repair a communications satellite encounters a derelict Soviet spacecraft with a dead crew—the result of a secret attempt to beat the United States to the Moon in the 1960s. Tom Nowicki played Major Andrei Mikoyan, a Russian member of the Space Shuttle crew, in the story.

== Later allusions ==
- While the 1964 U.S. edition of the Guinness Book of World Records credits Gagarin's Vostok 1 as "earliest successful manned satellite", a footnote names nine putative lost cosmonauts: eight mentioned above (Ledovsky, Schiborin, Mitkov, Belokonev, Kachur, Grachev, Dolgov, and Ilyushin) and Gennadiy Mikhailov (named by the Judica-Cordiglia brothers).
- Julius Epstein wrote several papers on "Soviet failures in Space", including allegations of lost cosmonauts, which were read into the Congressional Record in 1965 and 1971.
- In 1993, Sun, a U.S. supermarket tabloid, ran a story recounting multiple cosmonaut deaths and ensuing body recovery missions between 1968 and 1988.
- In 2010 the Canadian band Wolf Parade released a song titled "Yulia", which lead singer Dan Boeckner confirmed in an interview as recounting a lost cosmonaut.

== See also ==
- List of spaceflight-related accidents and incidents
