= Censorship of images in the Soviet Union =

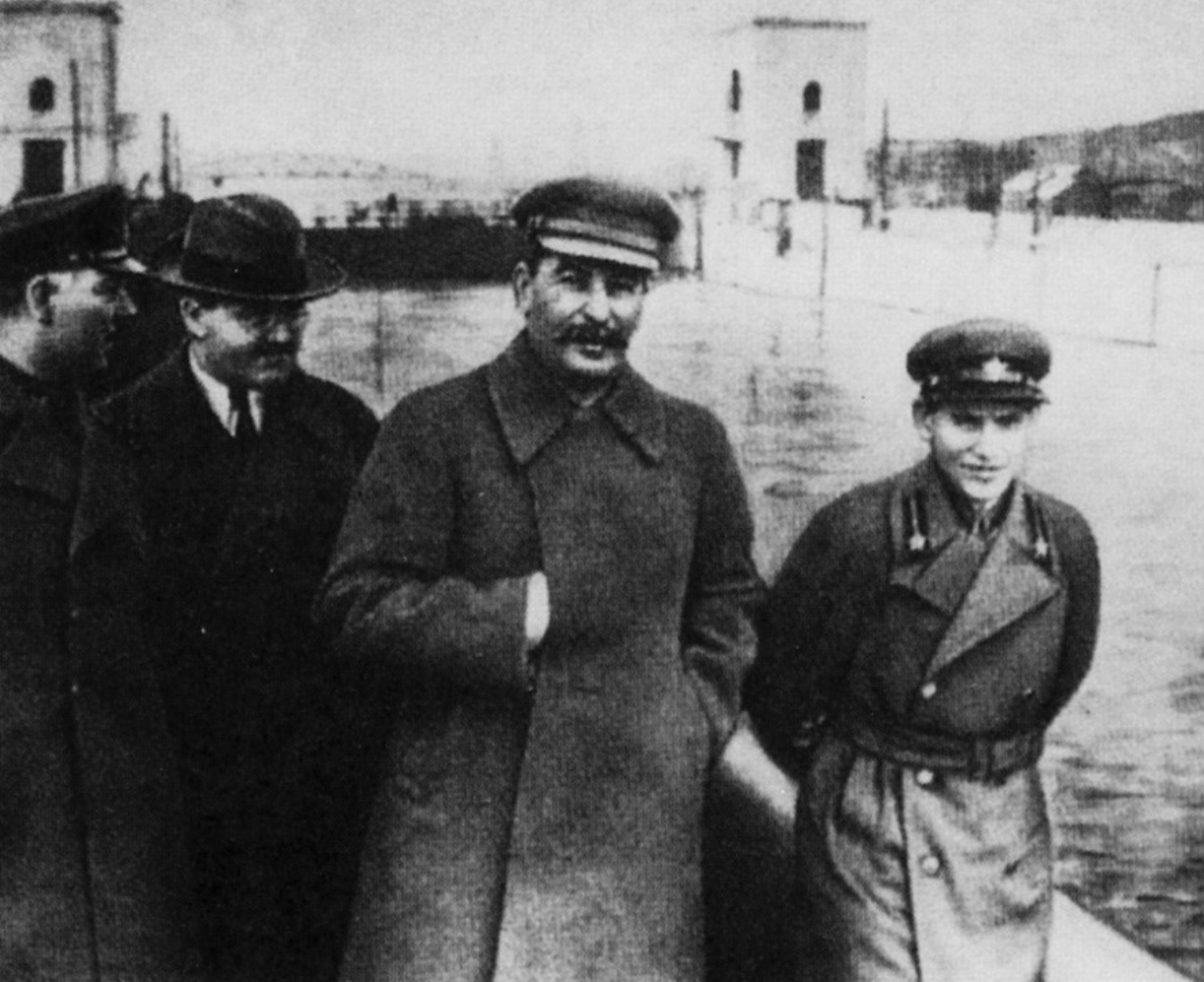

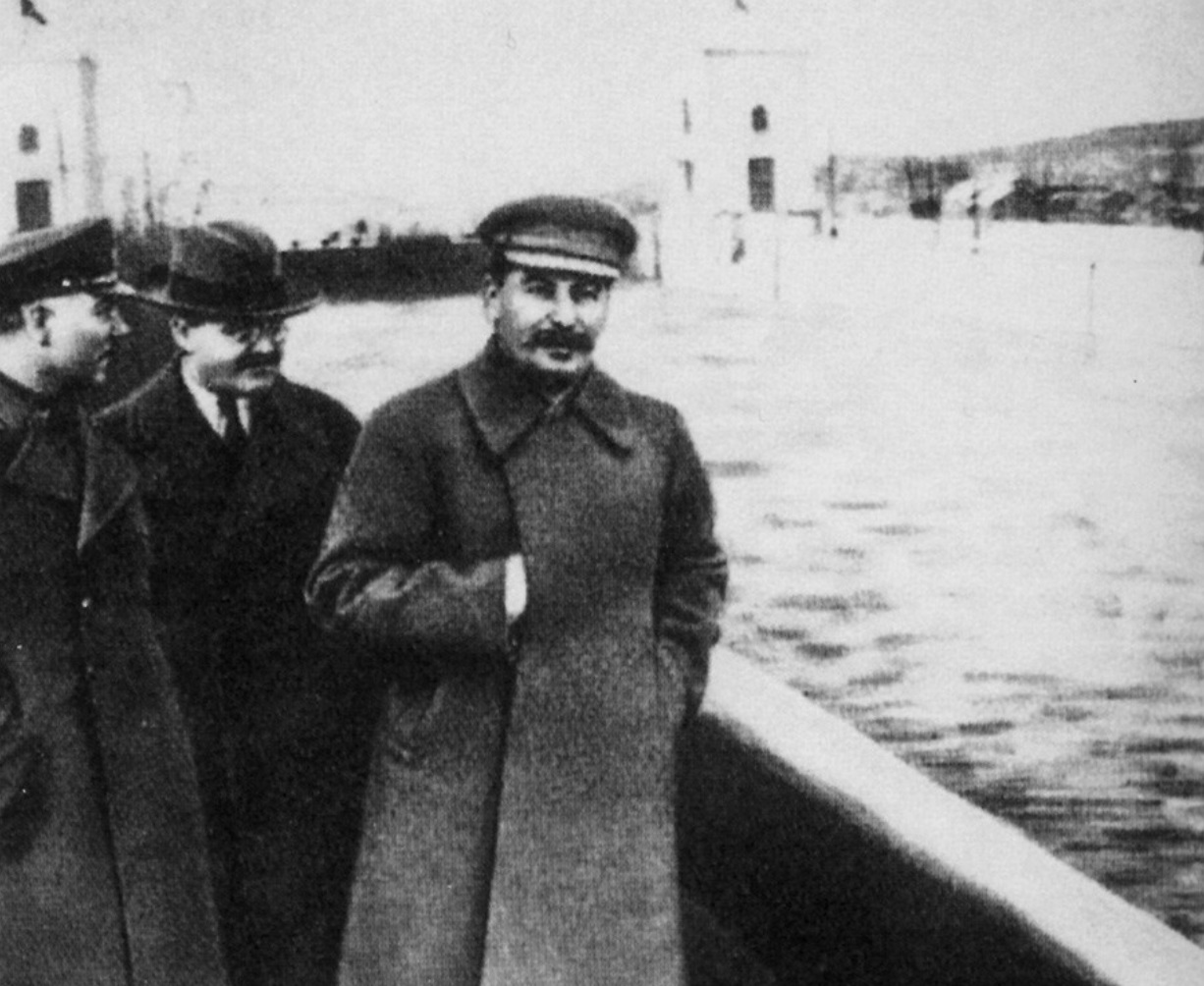
One example showing Nikolai Yezhov being removed after he was purged

Censorship of images was widespread in the Soviet Union. Visual censorship was exploited in a political context, particularly during the political purges of Joseph Stalin, where the Soviet government attempted to erase some of the purged figures from Soviet history, and took measures which included altering images and destroying film. The USSR curtailed access to pornography, which was specifically prohibited by Soviet law.

== Censorship of pornographic images ==
Soviet law prohibited the creation and distribution of pornography under Article 228 of the criminal code of the Russian Soviet Federative Socialist Republic and analogous legislation adopted by other republics of the Soviet Union.

While nude shots appeared in a number of Soviet films before the glasnost reform of the 1980s, the 1988 film Little Vera was the first to include an explicit sex scene.

Pornographic images and videotapes were smuggled into the Soviet Union for illegal distribution. In addition to the anti-pornographic law, such smuggling was prohibited by legal provisions giving the Soviet state the exclusive right to conduct foreign economic trade.

== Censorship of historical photographs ==
=== Lenin's speech ===
On May 5, 1920, Lenin gave a famous speech to a crowd of Soviet troops in Sverdlov Square, Moscow. In the foreground were Leon Trotsky and Lev Kamenev. The photo was later altered and both were removed by censors.

==== Leon Trotsky ====
Leon Trotsky (Russian: Лeв Давидович Трóцкий) was a Ukrainian-born ethnically-Jewish Bolshevik revolutionary and Marxist theorist, and Lenin's strongest collaborator. He was an influential politician in the early days of the Soviet Union, first as People's Commissar for Foreign Affairs and later as the founder and commander of the Red Army and People's Commissar of War. He was also among the first members of the Politburo. After Lenin's death, he led the failed struggle of the Left Opposition against the policies and rise of Joseph Stalin in the 1920s, leading to his exile and eventual assassination. Stalin viewed him as a leading competitor for power, and ordered Trotsky's name and image to be thoroughly erased from Soviet history.

=== Nikolai Yezhov ===
After his arrest Yezhov was scrubbed from official photographs, most famously one showing him beside Stalin at the Moscow–Volga Canal.

=== October Revolution celebration ===
On November 7, 1919, this image was snapped of the Soviet leadership celebrating the second anniversary of the October Revolution. After Trotsky and his allies fell from power, a number of figures were removed from the image, including Trotsky and two people over to Lenin's left, wearing glasses and giving a salute. Lev Kamenev, two men over on Lenin's right, was another of Stalin's opponents, and below the boy in front of Trotsky, another bearded figure, Artemic Khalatov, the one time head of the state publishing, was also edited out.

==== Lev Kamenev ====
Kamenev was born in Moscow, the son of a Jewish railway worker and a Russian Orthodox housewife. He joined the Russian Social Democratic Labor Party (RSDLP) in 1901 and its Bolshevik faction when the party split into Bolsheviks and Mensheviks in August 1903. He climbed the ranks of the Soviet leadership and was briefly the nominal head of the Soviet state in 1917 and later chairman (1923–1924) of the ruling Politburo.

After Sergei Kirov's murder on December 1, 1934, which precipitated Stalin's Great Purges, Zinoviev, Kamenev and their closest associates were once again expelled from the Communist Party and arrested in December 1934. They were tried in January 1935 and were forced to admit "moral complicity" in Kirov's assassination. Zinoviev was sentenced to 10 years in prison, Kamenev to five years in prison. Kamenev was charged separately in early 1935 in connection with the Kremlin Plot and, although he refused to confess, was sentenced to ten years in prison.

In August 1936, after months of careful preparations and rehearsals in Soviet secret police prisons, Zinoviev, Kamenev and 14 others, mostly Old Bolsheviks, were put on trial again in the Moscow Trials. Kamenev and all the others were found guilty and were executed by shooting on August 25, 1936.

=== Postcard ===
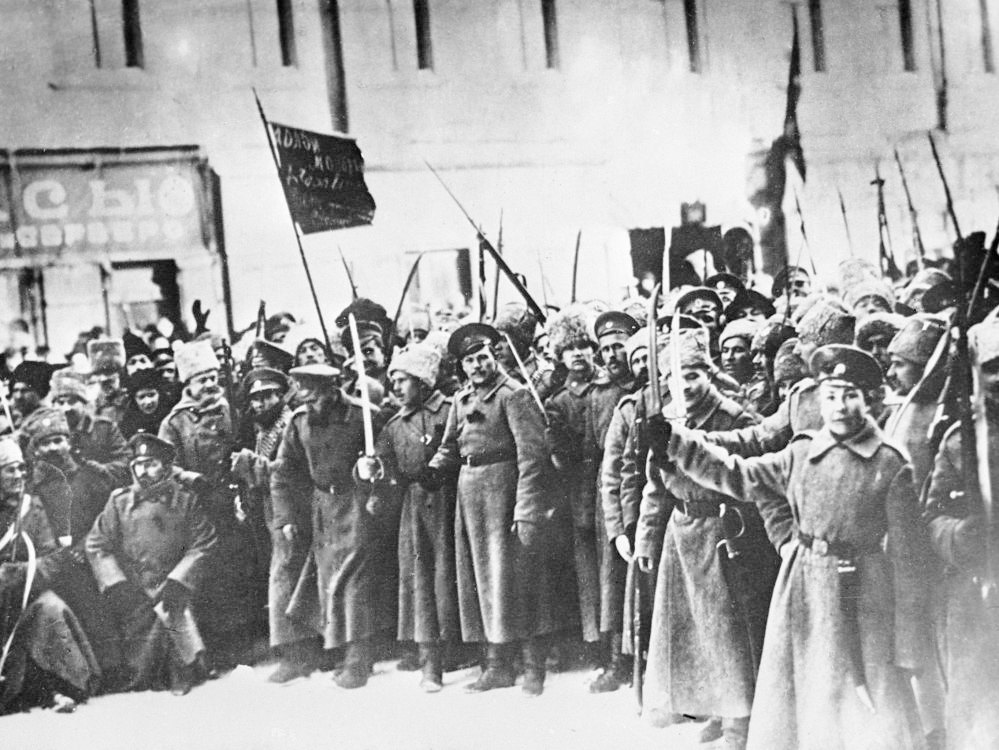

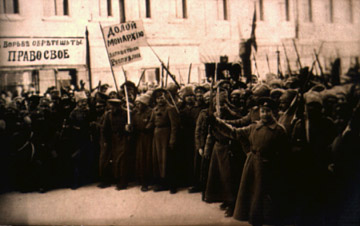
Taken in 1917, the signs have been changed

On November 7, 1917, Bolshevik leader Vladimir Lenin led his leftist revolutionaries in a revolt against the ineffective Provisional Government (Russia was still using the Julian Calendar at the time, so it is still called the October Revolution). The October Revolution ended the phase of the revolution instigated in February of that year, replacing Russia's short-lived provisional parliamentary government with government by soviets, local councils elected by bodies of workers and peasants. Liberal and monarchist forces, loosely organized into the White Army, immediately went to war against the Bolsheviks' Red Army.

During the Revolution a number of pictures were taken of successful fighters celebrating their victories. These were often used as postcards after the war. The background of the original image includes a store that says in Russian, "Watches, gold and silver". The image was then changed to read, "Struggle for your rights", and a flag was changed to more clearly read, "Down with the monarchy – long live the Republic!".

=== Union of Struggle for the Liberation of the Working Class ===
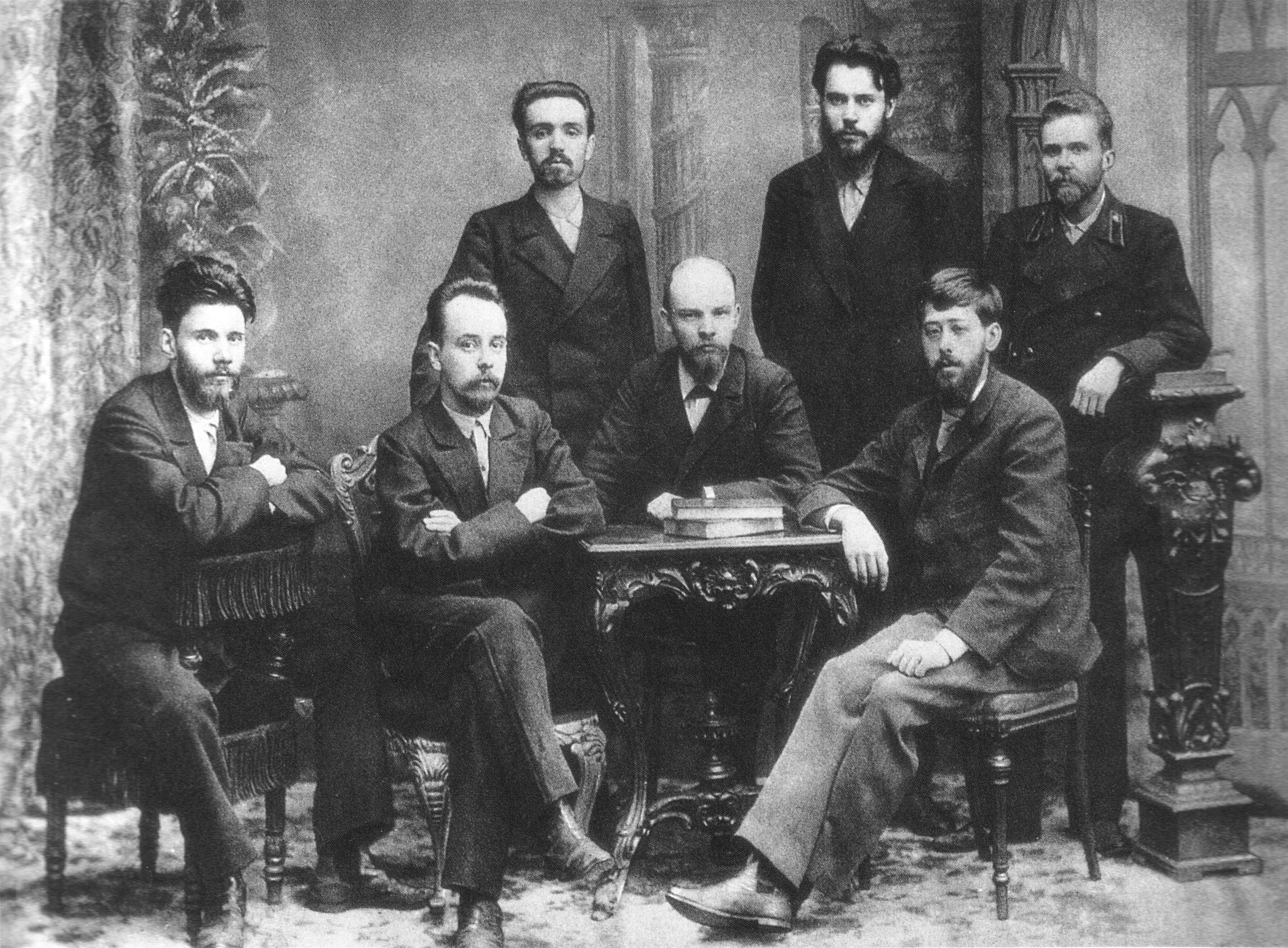

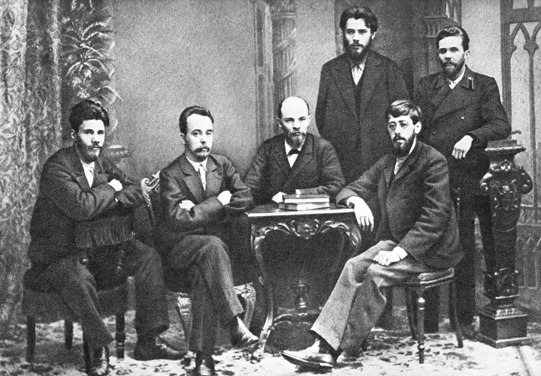
Alexander Malchenko has been edited out.

The Union for Struggle of the Liberation of the Working Class (Russian: Союз борьбы за освобождение рабочего класса), a St Petersburg-based organization, was founded by a number of Russian revolutionaries including Mikhail Kalinin and Lenin. They would eventually merge with other groups to lay the foundation for the Russian Social Democratic Labour Party (RSDRP). The RSDRP formed in 1898 in Minsk to unite the various revolutionary organizations into one party. It would later split into Bolshevik and Menshevik factions, with the Bolsheviks eventually becoming the Communist Party of the Soviet Union.

This picture, taken in February 1897, records a meeting of the St. Petersburg chapter of the Union of Struggle for the Liberation of the Working Class. Shortly after the picture was taken, the Okhrana arrested the whole group. The members received various punishments, with Lenin being arrested, held by authorities for fourteen months and then released and exiled to the village of Shushenskoye in Siberia, where he mingled with such notable Marxists as Georgy Plekhanov, who had introduced socialism to Russia.

Standing at center is Alexander Malchenko. At the time of this picture he was an engineering student and his mother would let Lenin hide out at her house. After his arrest he spent some time in exile before returning in 1900 and abandoning the revolution. He moved to Moscow, where he worked as a senior engineer in various state departments before in 1929 being arrested, wrongfully accused of being a "wrecker" and executed on November 18, 1930. After his arrest and execution he was airbrushed out of all reproductions. In 1958 he was posthumously rehabilitated and reappeared in reproductions of the image.

=== "Lost" cosmonaut ===
After cosmonaut Valentin Bondarenko died in a training accident in 1961, the Soviet government airbrushed him out of photographs of the first group of cosmonauts. As Bondarenko had already appeared in publicly available photographs, the deletions led to rumours of cosmonauts dying in failed launches. Both Bondarenko's existence and the nature of his death were secret until 1986.

=== Flag on the Reichstag ===
As Berlin fell in the closing days of the World War in Europe, Red Army photographer Yevgeny Khaldei gathered some soldiers and posed a shot of them hoisting the flag (called the Victory Banner) on the roof of the Reichstag building. The photo represented a historic moment, the defeat of Germany in a war that cost the Soviet Union tens of millions of lives.

After taking the symbolic photo, Khaldei quickly returned to Moscow. He further edited the image at the request of the editor-in-chief of the Ogonyok, who noticed that Sen. Sgt. Abdulkhakim Ismailov, who is supporting the flag-bearer in the photo, had a wristwatch on each arm, indicating he had been looting. Later Soviet sources claimed that the extra watch was actually an Adrianov compass and that Khaldei, in order to avoid controversy, doctored the photo to remove the watch from Ismailov's right wrist. Khaldei also copied smoke in the background of another photo to make the scene more dramatic.

The photo was published May 13, 1945, in the Ogonyok magazine. While many photographers took pictures of flags on the roof, it was Khaldei's image that stuck.

== See also ==
- Censorship in the Soviet Union
- Damnatio memoriae
- Eastern Bloc information dissemination
- Newseum
- Printed media in the Soviet Union
- Propaganda in the Soviet Union

== Bibliography ==
Notes

References

- Adams, Simon (2008). The Eastern Front (2008 ed.). The Rosen Publishing Group. ISBN 978-1-4042-1862-8.
- Antill, Peter; Dennis, Peter (October 10, 2005). Berlin 1945: end of the Thousand Year Reich (when ed.). Osprey Publishing. ISBN 1-84176-915-0.
- Baumann, Von Doc (2010-01-03). "Dramatische Rauchwolcken" (in German). Der Spiegel.
- Broekmeyer, M. J. (2004). Stalin, the Russians, and their war: 1941-1945 (2004 ed.). University of Wisconsin Press. ISBN 0-299-19594-5.
- Conquest, Robert (1991). The great terror: a reassessment (1991 ed.). Oxford University Press US. ISBN 0-19-507132-8.
- Dallas, Gregor (2006). 1945: The War That Never Ended (2006 ed.). Yale University Press. ISBN 0-300-11988-7.
- Lawton, Anna (1992). Kinoglasnost: Soviet Cinema in Our Time. Cambridge University Press. ISBN 0-521-38117-7.
- Lenin, Vladimir (1929). Collected Works, Volume XX (1929 ed.). International Publishers. ISBN 1-4179-1577-3.
- Lindemann, Albert S. (2000). Esau's tears: modern anti-semitism and the rise of the Jews (2000 ed.). Cambridge University Press. ISBN 0-521-79538-9.
- Tissier, Tony Le (1999). Race for the Reichstag: the 1945 Battle for Berlin (1999 ed.). Routledge. ISBN 0-7146-4929-5.
- Walkowitz, Daniel J.; Knauer, Lisa Maya (November 30, 2004). Memory and the impact of political transformation in public space Radical perspectives (when ed.). Duke University Press. ISBN 0-8223-3364-3.
