= The Fear of 13 (play) =

2024 play by Lindsey Ferrentino

- Original language: English
- Written by: Lindsey Ferrentino
- Based on: The Fear of 13 by David Sington

Premiere
- Place: Donmar Warehouse, London, England
- Directed by: Justin Martin
- Original run: October 10, 2024 – November 30, 2024

The Fear of 13 is a play by American playwright Lindsey Ferrentino, based on David Sington's 2015 documentary of the same name. It follows death row inmate Nick Yarris as he attempts to overturn his convictions for rape and murder with DNA evidence, eventually with the support and love of a prison volunteer.

The Fear of 13 premiered at the Donmar Warehouse in London on October 10, 2024, starring Adrien Brody as Yarris and Nana Mensah as prison volunteer Jackie Schaffer. While the show received mixed-to-positive reviews from critics, it was sold out throughout the duration of its run, playing until November 30. At the 2025 Laurence Olivier Awards, The Fear of 13 received a nomination for Best New Play, and Brody was nominated for Best Actor. In 2026, the play was restaged on Broadway, with Brody reprising his role as Yarris and Tessa Thompson playing the role of Jacki, a reworked version of Yarris's love interest. The show opened on April 15 at the James Earl Jones Theatre to lukewarm reviews. Though the Broadway production was initially scheduled for a limited run until July 12, it ultimately closed two weeks early.

== Synopsis ==
Nick Yarris is a death row inmate who, at the start of the play, has been incarcerated in the Huntingdon State Prison for sixteen years. When he meets Jacki, a volunteer with the Western Pennsylvania Coalition Against the Death Penalty, he begins to strike up a friendship with her, in part because he is one of the few inmates who does not harass her when she enters the prison. The two gradually bond over their shared love of literature: having spent most of his days in isolation, Nick has become a voracious reader in order to fill the time. As their relationship grows stronger, Nick regales Jacki with anecdotes from his life, ranging from his misadventures with childhood friends to his 30-day escape to Florida from the custody of county sheriffs, while en route from the Pennsylvania prison to a court hearing. Neither she nor the audience can be sure how many of his stories are true.

Nick eventually confides in Jacki that he was wrongfully convicted, a situation that occurred after he erroneously accused a childhood acquaintance of committing the rape and murder of Linda Mae Craig, in an attempt to lighten lesser charges he acquired after a heated encounter with a police officer. Jacki commits to helping Nick overturn his conviction; eventually, the two fall in love. Over the course of several years, the couple attempts to prove Nick's innocence with the emerging technology of DNA profiling, though these efforts are repeatedly thwarted due to the mishandling of evidence. Jacki even marries Nick, thinking he will soon be free. Eventually, however, she decides to leave him, having come to the conclusion that his appeals are hopeless. After this, Nick pens a letter to the assigned judge requesting his execution, but instead his lawyer informs him that new DNA testing has finally exonerated him.

In the wake of this news, Nick takes a long shower, which causes him to reflect on the sexual assault he experienced at nine years old, an incident whose traumatic after-effects he believes set him on the tragic path his life took. Once released, Nick delivers a monologue extolling the small pleasures in life and remembering his childhood dog.

== Development ==
I think Adrien Brody is a once-in-a-generation talent. He’s open-hearted, deeply intelligent, very sensitive, very intellectual, but also very street smart, cunning, clever, witty. You can believe he would rob you, but you can also believe he would read Tolstoy. And Adrien is the only person I can think of that can do all those things, that can play an ex-con and can play a concert pianist. And that’s what Nick is. He has the soul of a poet, but a criminal history, and is a brilliant, sensitive, open-hearted romantic, and has had really hard circumstances, and used to be in prison fights, but also used to go back to his cell and read great literature and fall in love. It’s a cliche about containing multitudes, but that’s the most succinct way of saying it: both Nick and Adrien Brody contain the same multitudes.

— Lindsey Ferrentino, The Guardian (2024)

During the COVID-19 lockdown period, playwright Lindsey Ferrentino encountered the documentary The Fear of 13, which depicts death row exoneree Nick Yarris narrating stories from his incarceration, on the streaming service Netflix. Having felt unmoored by the extended isolation of the pandemic, Ferrentino became drawn to adapting non-fiction stories in her work as a way to ground herself; her book for the musical The Queen of Versailles, based on the 2012 documentary of the same name, also emerged from this period. While watching The Fear of 13, she was particularly compelled by Yarris's "deeply theatrical" manner of narrating stories. Though the documentary only makes a passing mention of Yarris's eventual marriage to Jackie Schaffer, an anti-death penalty advocate who bonded with him during his imprisonment, Ferrentino felt that this relationship would make an effective premise for a dramatic narrative of his story. After coming up with the idea to adapt The Fear of 13 into a stage play, Ferrentino began reaching out to Yarris, texting with him and visiting him in Los Angeles, California. She would gradually cultivate a friendship with Yarris while consulting with him.

Ferrentino had actor Adrien Brody in mind to portray Nick Yarris early in the development process; she has described him as being "deeply sensitive and intellectual, but street smart and savvy" in a way that reminded her of Yarris. She initially met with Brody about playing a character in a potential film adaptation of her play Amy and the Orphans, where she also provided him with an early draft of The Fear of 13. Primarily a screen actor, Brody had not previously acted onstage as an adult; his lone professional theatrical credit prior to The Fear of 13 came from a Theater for the New City production of the play Family Pride in the 50s, in which he appeared at age 12. Nonetheless, while he was not actively seeking out a theatrical project at the time, Ferrentino's draft moved him to such an extent that he was eager to participate in the production. He has stated that he "could not get through [the script] without crying" the first few times he read it. After agreeing to star in the show, Brody began closely collaborating with Ferrentino on subsequent drafts of the play, refining the language Yarris uses in order to convey his background as a juvenile delinquent. Brody even wrote a draft of a monologue he delivers in the play during the development process.

Though the play retains the title of the documentary on which it was based, The Fear of 13 never makes direct reference to the term triskaidekaphobia, the word that gives the film its name. In the documentary, Yarris uses this term to demonstrate the number of words he learned while in prison; the term resonated with him because he suffered a sexual assault as a child, during which his assailant justified his actions by claiming that Yarris appeared to be thirteen, an age at which the perpetrator believed one could be treated as an adult. While this incident is depicted in the play, the word Yarris's fictional stand-in chooses to showcase his literacy is instead incredulous. Additionally, though Yarris's love interest in the play is loosely based on Jackie Schaffer, Yarris's actual ex-wife, she is not intended to be a direct analogue of her.

== Production history ==
=== London (2024) ===
On June 25, 2024, Donmar Warehouse artistic director Tim Sheader announced his inaugural season of productions at the venue, which was slated to open with The Fear of 13, with Adrien Brody set to portray Nick Yarris. Justin Martin served as the show's director. On August 29, Nana Mensah's casting as Jackie Schaffer was announced alongside the remainder of the cast. The production began previews on October 4, formally opening on October 10 and closing on November 30, 2024. Performances were sold out throughout the duration of the run.

=== Broadway (2026) ===
On January 13, 2026, production companies associated with The Fear of 13 announced that the show would transfer to Broadway at the James Earl Jones Theatre. Adrien Brody was set to reprise his role as Yarris, with Tessa Thompson cast as Jacki; the show marked both performers' Broadway debuts. Thompson has stated that her role in the 2025 film Hedda, an updated adaptation of Henrik Ibsen's play Hedda Gabler, inspired her to pursue more stage roles, as she had acted in regional and off-Broadway productions in the past. The show was produced in collaboration with the Innocence Project, a nonprofit organization that advocates for freeing wrongfully incarcerated prisoners with the usage of DNA evidence. David Cromer was announced as the show's director, marking his second production of the 2025–2026 Broadway season, following a revival of the Tracy Letts play Bug. The show also marked Lindsey Ferrentino's second Broadway show of the season, as she had written the book for the musical The Queen of Versailles, which opened on Broadway in November 2025.

The show's additional cast members were announced on February 9. Notably, this group of actors included Ephraim Sykes, who performed songs by the Temptations in The Fear of 13 alongside the cast's ensemble, including "I Wish It Would Rain" and "Just My Imagination (Running Away with Me)". Sykes had previously originated the role of Temptations frontman David Ruffin in the Broadway jukebox musical Ain't Too Proud, for which he received a nomination for Best Performance by a Featured Actor in a Musical at the 73rd Tony Awards.

Previews for the show opened on March 19, and the play formally opened on April 15, with an initial closing date of July 12. Two days before the show's opening night, media personality Kim Kardashian was announced as a co-producer of The Fear of 13, marking her Broadway producing debut. She cited her passion for criminal justice reform as her impetus for participating in the production. On May 14, the show hosted a benefit performance for the Innocence Project, which was accompanied by a talk-back session featuring Brody, Thompson, Ferrentino, attorney Christina Swarns (the executive director of the Innocence Project, who had served as one of the public defenders on the real Nick Yarris's case), and Innocence Project client Termaine Hicks. Actors Leonardo DiCaprio, Robert De Niro, and Timothée Chalamet were all seen attending various showings of the play. The real Nick Yarris frequently appeared at performances throughout the show's Broadway run.

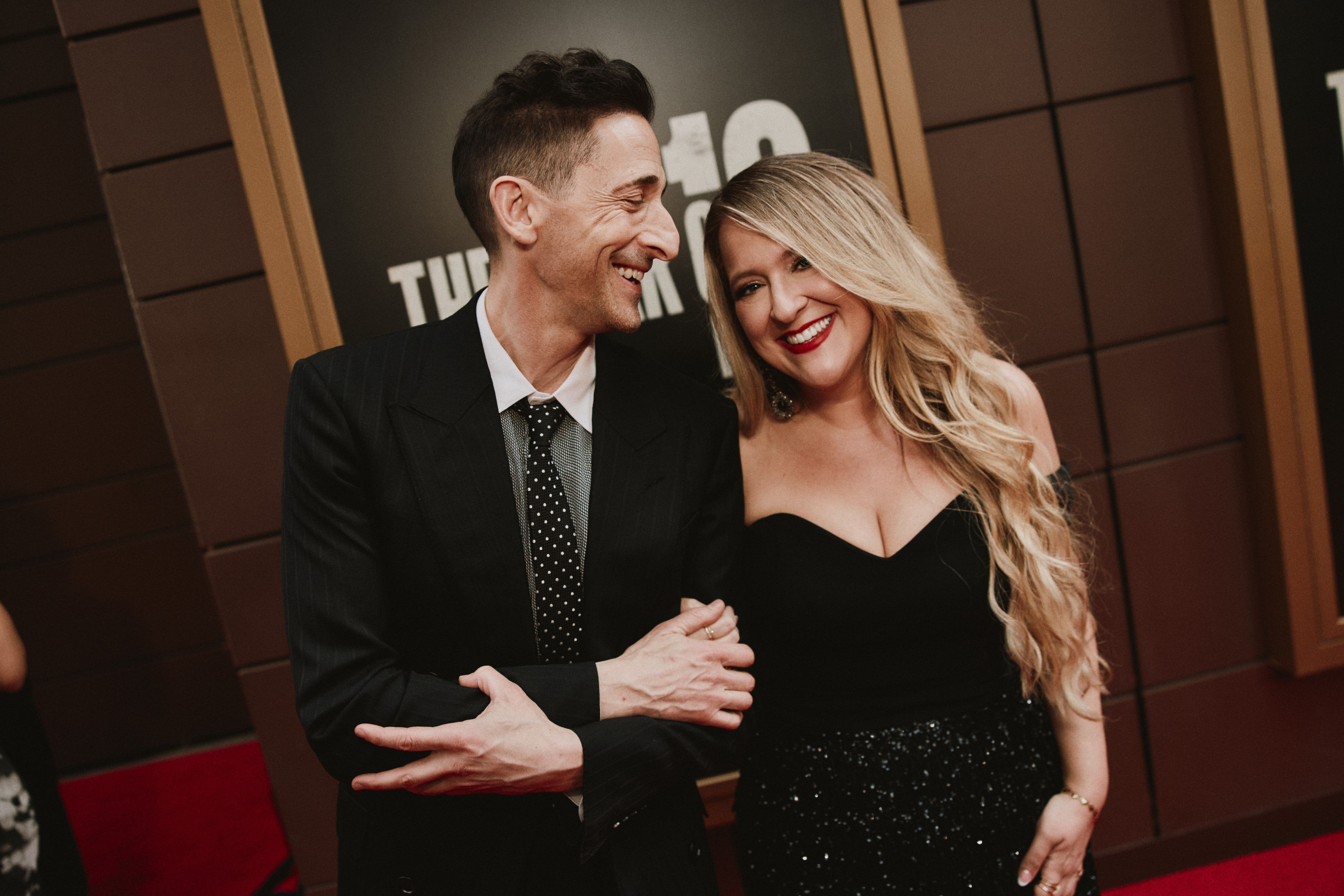
Adrien Brody (left) and Lindsey Ferrentino (right) at the opening night event for The Fear of 13 on Broadway

The show's Broadway transfer announcement came over ten months after Adrien Brody won his second Academy Award for Best Actor for his performance in the film The Brutalist at the 97th Academy Awards. Brody took a deliberate break from accepting new roles after winning the Academy Award; his appearance in the Broadway transfer of The Fear of 13 marked his first performance after accepting the prize. Brody was initially apprehensive about starring in a Broadway production, citing his lack of experience acting onstage under such a rigorous schedule as a deterrent. However, he has stated that encouragement from his girlfriend, Georgina Chapman, as well as media executive Anna Wintour, motivated him to reprise the role. Brody lived alone in a Midtown hotel throughout the show's run, including during rehearsals, and only interacted with others during performances or press events. He reported struggling with the task of depicting a number of bleak circumstances across a single, sustained performance, and has said that this prolonged isolation allowed him to better access his emotions during the show.

The Broadway production of The Fear of 13 differed somewhat from its London inception. The number of male ensemble roles, which require performers to alternately play prison guards and inmates, was expanded. The set was more elaborate as well. Additionally, while Yarris's love interest was named "Jackie Schaffer", after Yarris's real ex-wife, in the London version of the play, (Note: Attributed to multiple references:) the character's name is changed to "Jacki Miles" in the Broadway version, making more clear that the playwright has reimagined her; she is not closely based on the real person. (Note: Attributed to multiple references:) The same is true of the lawyer character.

On June 10, the official website for The Fear of 13 removed ticket purchasing windows for all performances after June 28, two weeks before the show's initial closing date. Deadline editor Greg Evans speculated that this shift occurred due to both low ticket sales and the fact that the show only received two nominations at the 79th Tony Awards, neither of which it won. Despite the fact that the show's producers never shared a formal press release about these cancellations, the show played its final performance on June 28, 2026. In total, the Broadway iteration of The Fear of 13 played 28 previews and 87 regular performances. Following The Queen of Versailles, this marked the second of Ferrentino's shows from the 2025–2026 Broadway season to have closed earlier than expected.

== Reception ==
=== London (2024) ===
Critical reception of The Fear of 13 in London was somewhat mixed, though many critics trended toward positivity. Writing for The Telegraph, Claire Allfree described the production as a "wrenching portrait of the inequities of American justice", complimenting the "doe-eyed sincerity" and "bewildered, swaggering, teenage vulnerability" Adrien Brody brought to his portrayal of Nick Yarris. She also noted the "balletic fluency" of the cast's ensemble performers and praised the production for its refusal to "sensationalise" the story on which it was based. In a review for The Times, critic Clive Davis stated that "Brody delivers an intense, soul-baring performance in his London stage debut", declaring that Tim Sheader's time as the Donmar Warehouse's artistic director was "off to an exemplary start". In a WhatsOnStage review, Alex Wood remarked that Lindsey Ferrentino's script "gallops with innovative charm where it could, quite easily, have trotted along with pedestrian paint-by-numbers storytelling", and noted that set designer Miriam Buether's work "[generated] an oppressive claustrophobic sense of confined space that is disarmingly flexible when required".

Many critics praised Brody for his ability to balance Nick Yarris's despair and erratic demeanor with a degree of charisma: writing for The Independent, Alice Saville characterized Brody's performance as "intriguingly lithe and strange"; in a review for The Standard, Nick Curtis described Brody's presence as "tousled, impossibly lean and charmingly wolfish", calling his performance "magnetic and engaging". In a capsule review for The Observer, Susannah Clapp remarked, "Loopy and musing, Brody is off-whack and beguiling." Nana Mensah was also the subject of considerable acclaim: Clapp described her performance as "just right in her crispness and compassion", and Wood called her "the heart of the piece".

However, some critics also took issue with the play's episodic structure, arguing that the narrative attempted to include too many anecdotes in its runtime, preventing it from achieving the melancholic tone it sought to cultivate. In a review for The Guardian, Arifa Akbar stated, "[T]his play tries to squeeze it all in so that it seems like a whistle-stop narrative of events, rather than a poised, potent dramatisation". Additionally, Curtis described the play as a "larky exercise in myth-making", claiming that "much of what unfolds seems daft or fantastical". The Fear of 13 was also criticized for its attempts at incorporating comedy into the story: Saville commented that "this play feels like an exercise in making horrors into something beautiful—or, to put it less positively, like a work that rubs the roughest edges off a murderous prison system, smoothing them with humour and sentimentality".

At the 2025 Laurence Olivier Awards, The Fear of 13 was nominated for Best New Play, and Brody was nominated for Best Actor in a Play. The Olivier Award nominations were announced just two days after Brody had won the Academy Award for Best Actor for his performance in the film The Brutalist at the 97th Academy Awards.

=== Broadway (2026) ===
The Broadway production of The Fear of 13 was the subject of consistently tepid reviews. Richard Lawson of The Guardian described the play as "mostly unremarkable"; Charles Isherwood of The Wall Street Journal called it "modestly affecting but plodding"; and David Rooney of The Hollywood Reporter dismissed it as a "bland, poorly conceived vehicle". Many American reviewers expressed qualms similar to those of London critics, criticizing its tonal shifts and lack of dimensional supporting characters. Helen Shaw of The New York Times called the decision to frame Nick Yarris as an unreliable narrator "bizarre" and expressed frustration with the play's decision to prioritize his relationship with Jacki over his own journey to self-actualization. Adam Feldman echoed this latter critique in his review for Time Out. Writing for Variety, Aramide Tinubu commented, "[B]ecause it toggles madly between tense horror and humor, The Fear of 13 is tonally off." In a Vulture review, Jackson McHenry wrote, "For a play ostensibly about the huge broken thing that is America's prison-industrial complex, The Fear of 13 spends little time thinking about larger systems, or even raging against the machine. [...] Yes, the injustice done to Yarris was unjust. But to what end, for whose benefit, or to assuage what fears?"

Adrien Brody's performance as Yarris proved significantly more divisive on Broadway than in London. He earned positive notices from some critics: Shaw noted that "Brody, a puppyish presence, has a particular capacity for bent sweetness", and praised the "easy confidence" he and Tessa Thompson displayed in their roles. Additionally, Charles McNulty of the Los Angeles Times declared that "the daredevil intensity that won Adrien Brody two Oscars translates forcefully to the stage", writing, "Some film actors seem lost when they make a foray onto the stage. Not Brody, whose chiseled, wiry presence is ever in motion, flailing, ducking, wincing, yearning. But it's his voice that exerts the most hypnotic force, moving from defensive parry to inner rumble that takes the entire audience at the James Earl Jones Theatre into his confidence."

That said, many critics were hesitant to embrace Brody's performance. Discussing his work in the play, McHenry made the following assessment in Vulture:

In his performance, Brody relishes the act of digging into a Philly accent and of capturing the back-broken physical bearing of a condemned man. That enthusiasm is in many ways valuable. Even in the harshest descriptions of the violence and almost unbelievably cruel twists of fate that Yarris endured (the DNA testing keeps getting accidentally mucked up), Brody lends him a vital indomitable spark. But he’s so enamored with that bravado, that of his character and his own, that he only glancingly finds a dimension beyond it.

Some critics took issue with the perceived garishness of Brody's street-level mannerisms. In a Theatrely review, Juan A. Ramírez remarked, "Brody is expectedly watchable and uber-committed, though the white-boy-swag vibe he loves to affect becomes grating in the wandering play". Writing for TheaterMania, Zachary Stewart stated, "I knew [the story] was BS within minutes of Adrien Brody pimp-rolling onstage, flailing his arms like an extra in a hip-hop music video. Telegraphing hoodlum-with-a-heart-of-gold while declining to explore the idiosyncrasies that make Yarris a compelling character, Brody is giving the kind of performance that unhelpfully raises questions beyond the scope of the play: If Nick grew up on the mean streets of Philadelphia, why does he talk like he's from Canarsie? [...] Never did I imagine I would witness the Oscar-winning star of The Pianist and The Brutalist give one of the most insufficient leading performances I've seen on a Broadway stage."

While Brody's performance was polarizing, many critics agreed that Tessa Thompson fared well in the play. In The Guardian, Lawson praised the "warmth and understatement" she brought to her performance, and in Time Out, Feldman stated that she was "quite luminous". Furthermore, McHenry described her as a "compelling stage presence, the kind of actor who, even in the act of listening, seems to be working out a thought behind her eyes", asserting that she "[felt] like a veteran". Some critics praised the performers' chemistry as well: in his review, Lawson stated, "[Brody] and Thompson complement each other well; Brody's most affecting moments are when Yarris and Jacki are caught in a moment of intimacy." In her New York Times piece, Shaw observed, "Nick's resigned desolation brightens the moment he meets Jacki. Brody, his narrow body jangling like a struck piano string, vibrates the more she leans toward him, a dead man reanimated by a woman's simple act of listening."

Despite the play's muted critical reception on Broadway, many awards prognosticators expressed surprise that Brody was not nominated for Best Performance by a Leading Actor in a Play at the 79th Tony Awards. His omission from the nominees was widely deemed one of the most noteworthy "snubs" of the 2025–2026 Broadway season, and was seen as indicative of a trend in which actors primarily known for film and television roles were largely shut out of the nominations that year. (Note: Attributed to multiple references:) However, Brody was later announced as one of the honorees for the 80th Annual Theatre World Awards, a class of performers awarded for an outstanding Broadway or off-Broadway debut performance.

== Awards and nominations ==
=== London (2024) ===
Year	Award	Category	Recipient	Result	Ref.
2025	Laurence Olivier Awards	Best New Play	Lindsey Ferrentino	Nominated	
2025	Laurence Olivier Awards	Best Actor	Adrien Brody	Nominated	

=== Broadway (2026) ===
Year	Award	Category	Recipient	Result	Ref.
2026	Drama Desk Awards	Outstanding Orchestrations	Bryan Carter	Nominated	
2026	Theatre World Awards	Outstanding Broadway or Off-Broadway Debut Performance	Adrien Brody	Honored	
2026	Tony Awards	Best Lighting Design of a Play	Heather Gilbert	Nominated	
2026	Tony Awards	Best Sound Design of a Play	Lee Kinney	Nominated	
