= List of awards and nominations received by Adrien Brody =

Adrien Brody awards and nominations
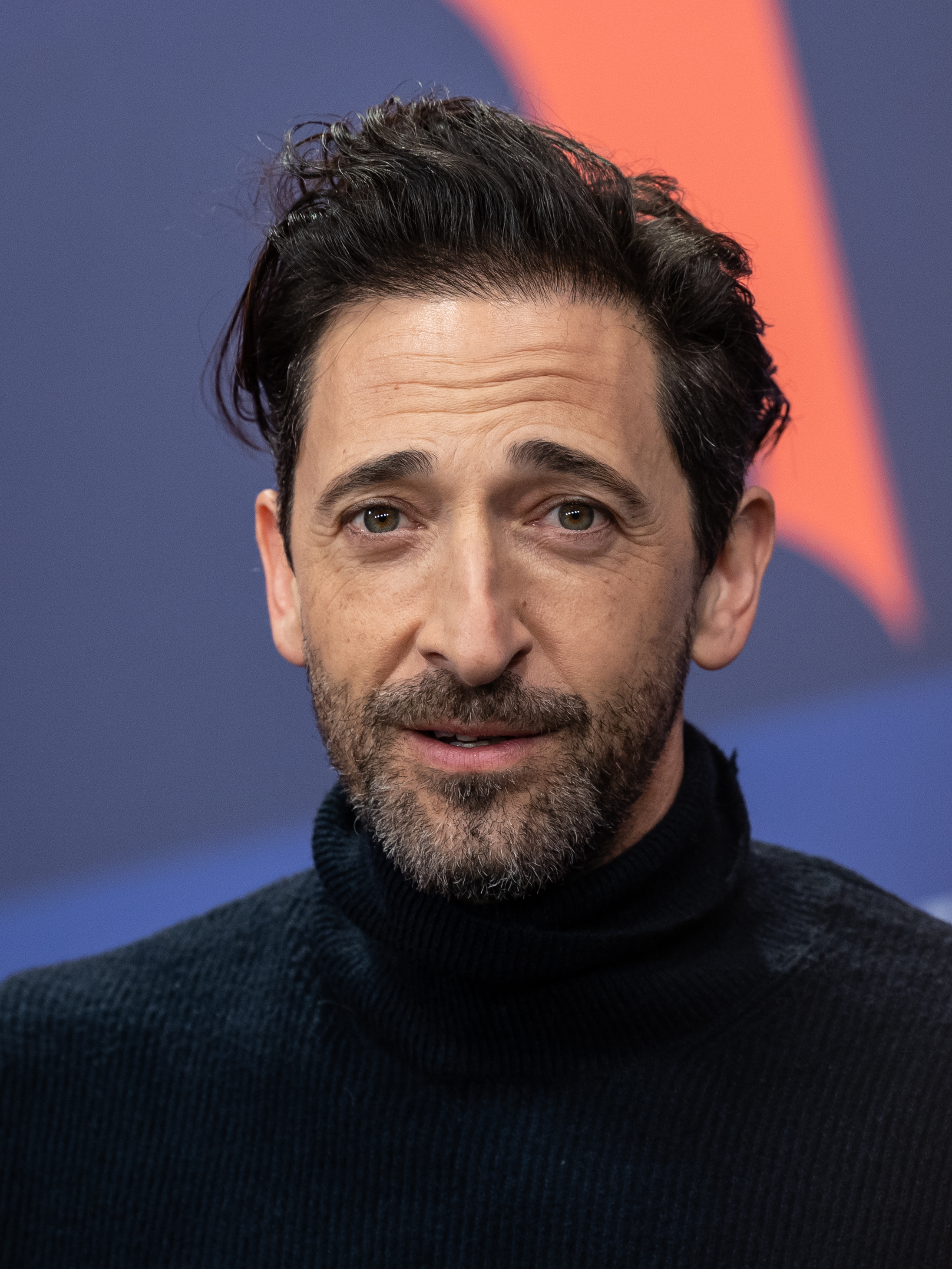
- Brody at Berlinale in 2024
Awards and nominations
Award	Wins	Nominations
Academy Awards	2	2
César Awards	1	1
Laurence Olivier Awards	0	1
Golden Globe Awards	1	2
BAFTA Awards	1	2
Critics’ Choice Awards	1	1
Emmy Awards	0	3
SAG Awards	0	5

Totals (Note: Certain award groups do not simply award one winner. They acknowledge several different recipients, have runners-up, and have third place. Since this is a specific recognition and is different from losing an award, runner-up mentions are considered wins in this award tally. For simplification and to avoid errors, each award in this list has been presumed to have had a prior nomination.)
- Wins: 14
- Nominations: 32

This article is a List of awards and nominations received by Adrien Brody.

Adrien Brody is an American actor known for his roles on stage and screen. He has received various accolades including two Academy Awards, a BAFTA Award and a Golden Globe Award as well as nominations for three Emmy Awards, and a Laurence Olivier Award.

Brody portrayed Władysław Szpilman in Roman Polanski's holocaust drama film The Pianist (2002), he received the Academy Award for Best Actor and the César Award for Best Actor. For his performance as a Hungarian architect László Tóth in the Brady Corbet epic historical drama The Brutalist (2024), he received his second Academy Award for Best Actor as well as the BAFTA Award for Best Actor in a Leading Role, the Critics' Choice Movie Award for Best Actor, and the Golden Globe Award for Best Actor in a Motion Picture – Drama.

For his roles on television, he received nominations for the Primetime Emmy Award for Outstanding Lead Actor in a Limited Series or Movie and the Screen Actors Guild Award for Outstanding Performance by a Male Actor in a Miniseries or Television Movie for his portrayal of Harry Houdini in the miniseries Houdini (2015). He was nominated for the Primetime Emmy Award for Outstanding Guest Actor in a Drama Series for playing a wealthy investor in the HBO drama-comedy series Succession episode "Lion in the Meadow" (2022).

On stage, Brody made his London theatre debut as death row inmate Nick Yarris in the Lindsey Ferrentino play The Fear of 13 (2024) at the Donmar Warehouse, for which he received a nomination for the Laurence Olivier Award for Best Actor.

== Major associations ==
=== Academy Awards ===
Year	Category	Nominated work	Result	Ref.
2003	Best Actor	The Pianist	Won	
2025	Best Actor	The Brutalist	Won	

=== BAFTA Awards ===
Year	Category	Nominated work	Result	Ref.
British Academy Film Awards
2003	Best Actor in a Leading Role	The Pianist	Nominated	
2025	Best Actor in a Leading Role	The Brutalist	Won	

=== Emmy Awards ===
Year	Category	Nominated work	Result	Ref.
Primetime Emmy Awards
2015	Outstanding Lead Actor in a Miniseries or Movie	Houdini	Nominated	
2016	Outstanding Narrator	Breakthrough	Nominated	
2022	Outstanding Guest Actor in a Drama Series	Succession (episode: "Lion in the Meadow")	Nominated	

=== Golden Globe Award ===
Year	Category	Nominated work	Result	Ref.
2003	Best Actor in a Motion Picture – Drama	The Pianist	Nominated	
2025	Best Actor in a Motion Picture – Drama	The Brutalist	Won	

=== Screen Actors Guild Awards ===
Year	Category	Nominated work	Result	Ref.
2003	Outstanding Actor in a Leading Role	The Pianist	Nominated	
2012	Outstanding Cast in a Motion Picture	Midnight in Paris	Nominated	
2015	Outstanding Cast in a Motion Picture	The Grand Budapest Hotel	Nominated	
2016	Outstanding Actor in a Miniseries or Television Movie	Houdini	Nominated	
2025	Outstanding Actor in a Leading Role	The Brutalist	Nominated	

=== Laurence Olivier Awards ===
Year	Category	Nominated work	Result	Ref.
2025	Best Actor	The Fear of 13	Nominated	

== Miscellaneous awards ==
Year	Association	Category	Project	Result	Ref.
1999	Satellite Awards	Outstanding Motion Picture Ensemble	The Thin Red Line	Won	
2001	Independent Spirit Awards	Best Male Lead	Restaurant	Nominated	
2002	Boston Society of Film Critics	Best Actor	The Pianist	Won	
2003	César Awards	Best Actor	The Pianist	Won	
2003	National Society of Film Critics Awards	Best Actor	The Pianist	Won	
2003	Chicago Film Critics Association Awards	Best Actor	The Pianist	Nominated	
2003	Dallas–Fort Worth Film Critics Association Awards	Best Actor	The Pianist	Nominated	
2015	Critics' Choice Movie Awards	Best Acting Ensemble	The Grand Budapest Hotel	Nominated	
2017	Cairo International Film Festival	Career Achievement Award		Won	
2022	Critics' Choice Super Awards	Best Actor in a Horror Series	Chapelwaite	Nominated	
2024	Gotham Awards	Outstanding Lead Performance	The Brutalist	Nominated	
2024	New York Film Critics Circle Awards	Best Actor	The Brutalist	Won	
2024	Astra Film Awards	Best Actor	The Brutalist	Nominated	
2024	Capri Hollywood International Film Festival	Best Actor	The Brutalist	Won	
2025	AARP Movies for Grownups Awards	Best Actor	The Brutalist	Won	
2025	Palm Springs International Film Festival	Desert Palm Achievement for Best Actor	The Brutalist	Won	
2025	Santa Barbara International Film Festival	Cinema Vanguard Award	The Brutalist	Won	
2025	Critics' Choice Movie Awards	Best Actor	The Brutalist	Won	
2026	Theatre World Awards	Outstanding Broadway or Off-Broadway Debut Performance	The Fear of 13	Honored	

== Honours ==
- Ellis Island Medal of Honor (10 May 2025).
