= Justin Martin (director) =

Australian theatre director

- Occupation: Director
- Years active: 2000–present
- Known for: The Jungle; Prima Facie; Stranger Things: First Shadow
- Awards: Full list

Justin Martin is an Australian director of theatre, film, and television who has worked mainly in England. He is known for his solo direction of the National Theatre production of Suzie Miller's play Prima Facie in 2021, as well as for his collaborations with director Stephen Daldry. One such collaboration is Stranger Things: The First Shadow, still running in the West End as of June 2025 after beginning its run in December 2023. His plays have also had Broadway runs. has received a BAFTA TV Award as well as nominations for two Laurence Olivier Awards and a Drama Desk Award.

== Early life and education ==
Justin Martin grew up in Australia.

He moved to London to be with a partner, and found that he enjoyed working there.

== Career ==
=== Theatre ===
Martin has had a long collaboration with theatre director Stephen Daldry. He was working as "resident director" on the Australian production of Billy Elliot when he met Daldry. He started working with him, first as assistant and then associate director, to co-director.

In 2013, he worked as assistant director with John Tiffany on the National Theatre of Scotland production of Jack Thorne's stage adaptation of the Swedish novel Let the Right One In at the Royal Court and then Apollo Theatre in London.

Martin worked as an associate director for Daldry's award-winning stage productions of the David Hare play Skylight, starring Bill Nighy and Carey Mulligan (2014); The Audience, starring Helen Mirren (2013); and The Inheritance (2018–9), all of which played on the West End and Broadway.

He worked as co-director with Daldry The Jungle (2017–2019), Kyoto (2024–5), and Stranger Things. As co-directors, the pair "divide up the show and then come back together to look at what the other has done". Martin co-directed The Jungle at The Young Vic (2017), in the West End, London (2018), and at St. Ann's Warehouse in New York (2018). The work was nominated for the Drama Desk Award for Outstanding Direction of a Play.

In 2021 he directed (solo) the West End production of Suzie Miller's play Prima Facie starring Jodie Comer, for which he was nominated for the Laurence Olivier Award for Best Director. The production transferred to Broadway at the Golden Theatre, with Comer reprising her role.

In December 2023 Martin began co-directing (with Daldry) the play Stranger Things: The First Shadow, a prequel to the Netflix streaming series at the Phoenix Theatre in the West End. Together they received a nomination for the Olivier Award for Best Director. As of June 2025 the play is still running at the Phoenix.

In 2024, Martin independently directed The Fear of 13, a play by Lindsey Ferrentino based on the 2015 documentary film of the same name. The Fear of 13 starred American actor Adrien Brody and opened at the Donmar Warehouse in London on October 10, 2024. The play is based on the true story of Nick Yarris, who was wrongly convicted of murder in the US in 1982, and spent 22 years on death row before being exonerated.

In July 2025, Martin directs Rosamund Pike in the West End debut of another National Theatre production of a Suzie Miller play, called Inter Alia. The play opens on 10 July at the Lyttelton Theatre. He said in mid-2025 that the pair had another collaboration planned, finishing a trilogy of legal dramas.

In 2026, he will once again direct Jodie Comer in a UK and Ireland tour of Prima Facie.

=== Screen ===
Martin's screen credits include work on the first two seasons of the award-winning Netflix period drama series The Crown as well as overseeing successful and record-breaking NT Live performances of Skylight (2014), The Audience (2015), and Prima Facie (2022), which hit number one at the UK cinema box office twice.

In 2021 Justin co-directed the BAFTA award-winning film Together with Stephen Daldry starring James McAvoy and Sharon Horgan, which won the British Academy Television Award for Best Single Drama.

== Activism ==
As of June 2025 Martin is an associate artist with Good Chance Theatre - a company dedicated to making work with and about refugees. He has directed a number of works for them, including working on a number of promos for "The Walk" - a theatre festival spanning 8000 km from The Syrian border to Manchester.

== Awards and nominations ==
Year	Award	Category	Project	Result	Ref.
2019	Drama Desk Award	Outstanding Director of a Play	The Jungle	Nominated	
2022	BAFTA TV Award	Best Single Drama	Together	Won	
2023	Laurence Olivier Award	Best Director	Prima Facie	Nominated	
2024	Laurence Olivier Award	Best Director	Stranger Things: The First Shadow	Nominated	

== Credits ==
=== Theatre ===
Year	Title	Playwright	Credit	Venue	Refs.
2011	Billy Elliot	Lee Hall	Resident director	National tour	
2013	Let the Right One In	Jack Thorne	Assistant director	Royal Court and Apollo Theatres, London	
2013	The Audience	Peter Morgan	Associate director	Gielgud Theatre, West End	
2015	The Audience	Peter Morgan	Associate director	Gerald Schoenfeld Theatre, Broadway	
2014	Skylight	David Hare	Associate director	Wyndhams Theatre, West End	
2015	Skylight	David Hare	Associate director	John Golden Theater, Broadway	
2017	The Jungle	Joe Robertson and Joe Murphy	Director	The Young Vic, London	
2019	The Jungle	Joe Robertson and Joe Murphy	Director	St. Ann's Warehouse, New York	
2018	The Inheritance Parts 1 & 2	Matthew López	Associate director	The Young Vic, London	
2020	The Inheritance Parts 1 & 2	Matthew López	Associate director	Ethel Barrymore Theatre, Broadway	
2022	Prima Facie	Suzie Miller	Director	Harold Pinter Theatre, West End	
2023	Prima Facie	Suzie Miller	Director	John Golden Theater, Broadway	
2023	Stranger Things: The First Shadow	Kate Trefry	Director	Phoenix Theatre, West End	
2024	Kyoto	Joe Robertson and Joe Murphy	Director	Swan Theatre, Stratford-upon-Avon	
2025	Kyoto	Joe Robertson and Joe Murphy	Director	@sohoplace, West End	
2024	The Fear of 13	Lindsey Ferrentino	Director	Donmar Warehouse, London	
2025	Stranger Things: The First Shadow	Kate Trefry	Director	Marquis Theatre, Broadway	

=== Television ===
Year	Title	Credit	Notes	Ref.
2013	The Audience	Associate director	National Theatre Live	
2014	Skylight	Associate director	National Theatre Live	
2016–2017	The Crown	Second unit director	Netflix series; 12 episodes	
2021	Together	Co-director	BBC Television film	
2022	Prima Facie	Director	National Theatre Live	
2023	The Lovers	Director	Sky Atlantic series; 6 episodes	
