= The Fear of 13 =

2015 British documentary

- Film poster
- Directed by: David Sington
- Produced by: Christopher Riley; David Sington; Haroula Rose
- Starring: Nick Yarris
- Cinematography: Clive North, Nickolas Rossi
- Edited by: Robert Sternberg
- Music by: Philip Sheppard
- Distributed by: Dogwoof
- Release date: 10 October 2015 (London Film Festival)
- Running time: 96 minutes
- Country: United Kingdom
- Language: English

The Fear of 13 is a 2015 British documentary film directed and co-produced by David Sington. It tells the story of an American, Nick Yarris, who was convicted and sentenced to death for a crime he did not commit. He spent 22 years on death row before being released in 2004 after DNA evidence proved his innocence.

A stage play of the same name based on the film, written by American playwright Lindsey Ferrentino, was first produced at the Donmar Warehouse in London in October–November 2024, starring Adrien Brody as Yarris. The play transferred to Broadway in 2026, opening at the James Earl Jones Theatre on April 15, with Brody reprising his role. Though the production was initially scheduled for a 16-week run, it concluded two weeks early, ultimately closing on June 28 of that year.

== Background and synopsis ==
The film tells the story of Nick Yarris, who was convicted and sentenced to death for a 1981 kidnapping, rape, and murder. He spent 22 years on death row in Pennsylvania. Yarris was released in 2004, after DNA evidence established his innocence.

In the film, Yarris tells his life story in the style of a one-man show. In a non-linear structure provided by the film's director and editor, Yarris reveals his early life, youthful transgressions, arrest, and time on death row, with several twists and turns. No one else is interviewed on screen. Supplementary archival footage, some original animation, and sound effects are occasionally included as Yarris describes events.

== Production ==
The Fear of 13 is a feature-length documentary film directed by David Sington, who also co-produced, along with Christopher Riley and Haroula Rose.

The score was composed by Philip Sheppard, Robert Sternberg served as the film's editor, while cinematography was by Clive North and Nickolas Rossi.

== Release and reception ==
The Fear of 13 premiered at the 2015 BFI London Film Festival, where it was nominated for Best Documentary Film.

On Rotten Tomatoes the film has an approval rating of 94% based on reviews from 16 critics, with an average rating of 7.38/10.

Time Out gave it four stars out of five, with the summary "This death row documentary sets up an intriguing mystery that'll keep you gripped until the final moments". The Times also gave it four stars, and praised Yarris's storytelling skills: "The Fear of 13 is riveting and that's mainly due to its extraordinary subject". Mark Kermode, writing in The Guardian, awarded the film three stars, and summarised its themes by writing "Yarris leads us on a labyrinthine journey that has as much to say about the art of storytelling as it does about the iniquities of crime and punishment".

== Stage adaptation ==
A stage play of the same name based on the documentary film, written by Lindsey Ferrentino, received its first production in October–November 2024 at the Donmar Warehouse in London. Australian director Justin Martin directed the production, which starred Adrien Brody as Yarris, with a cast of nine. Performances were sold out throughout the run. The Fear of 13 was nominated in 2025 for an Olivier Award for best new play, but did not win. Brody was likewise nominated for best leading actor but did not win the Olivier. An American production of the play, directed by David Cromer, opened at New York City's James Earl Jones Theatre, on April 15, 2026, again starring Brody and featuring Tessa Thompson. Each of those lead performers, previously known for film appearances, made their Broadway debut in the play. Though the production was initially scheduled to run until July 12 of that year, it eventually closed on June 28, two weeks earlier than expected. The Broadway production of The Fear of 13 received lukewarm reviews. (Note: Attributed to multiple references:)
