= Pamela Neville-Sington =

American writer (1959–2017)

Pamela A. Neville-Sington
- Born: Pamela A. Neville; March 30, 1959
- Died: March 1, 2017 (aged 57)
- Spouse: David Sington

Academic background
- Education: Harvard University, Somerville College, Oxford, Warburg Institute

Academic work
- Discipline: Literature
- Sub-discipline: Biography

Pamela A. Neville-Sington (née Neville; March 30, 1959 – March 1, 2017) was an American literary biographer and authority on the life and works of Fanny Trollope, Anthony Trollope, and Robert Browning.

== Early life ==
Pamela Neville was born in Cleveland, Ohio, on March 30, 1959. She received her advanced education at Harvard University followed by Somerville College, Oxford and a PhD at the Warburg Institute for which David Starkey was one of the examiners and which was published in volume III of The Cambridge History of the Book in Britain as "Press, politics and religion".

== Career ==
While completing her PhD, she worked as a freelance cataloguer for the rival booksellers Bernard Quaritch and Maggs. While at Maggs she discovered the printer Manuzio's copy of the first Latin translation of five mathematical treatises of Archimedes by Commandinus, an important document of the Renaissance that had been overlooked by the firm for 60 years.

Her first sole-authored book was Fanny Trollope: The Life and Adventures of a Clever Woman (1997) which her obituary writer in The Times thought appropriate to the author and the subject. The book examined the relationship between Fanny and her son Anthony Trollope in detail and shed new light on it. Neville-Sington also argued that Fanny, not Anthony, was the true originator of the repertoire of characters known as "Trollopian" such as the country parson and that Fanny was the basis for her son's character Glencora Palliser. She then edited a new edition of Fanny's Domestic Manners of the Americans for Penguin for which she also provided the introduction and notes and wrote the entry on Fanny for the Oxford Dictionary of National Biography.

In 2004, she produced Robert Browning: A Life After Death, which one reviewer described as "the best popular Browning biography for the past 60 years" and another as having "the quality of a superior Victorian novel".

In her forties, Neville-Sington was diagnosed with glaucoma which inhibited her examination of the primary sources she used to write biographies. She moved on to different forms of writing.

== Personal life ==
In 1987, she married David Sington, a documentary filmmaker who worked for the BBC, with whom she collaborated on a book on the influence of utopian thought. The couple had no children. A dog lover from youth when she had a poodle, she later kept Samoyeds whose breed history she studied carefully.

== Death ==
Neville-Sington died of pancreatic cancer on March 1, 2017.

== Selected publications ==
=== Authored ===
- Paradise dreamed: How utopian thinkers have changed the modern world. Bloomsbury, London, 1993. (With David Sington) ISBN 0747512930
- Fanny Trollope: The life and adventures of a clever woman. Viking, London, 1997. ISBN 0670859052
- Richard Hakluyt and his books &c. Hakluyt Society, 1997. (Hakluyt Society annual talk 1996) (With Anthony Payne) ISBN 0904180565
- "A primary purchase bibliography" in L.E. Pennington (Ed.) The purchase handbook, 2 vols., 2nd series, Hakluyt Society, London, II, 528, 1997.
- "A very good trumpet" in Cedric C. Brown & Arthur F. Marotti (Eds.) Texts and cultural change in early modern England. Palgrave, 1997. ISBN 0333662873
- "Press, politics and religion" in Lotte Hellinga & J. B. Trapp. (Eds.) (1999). The Cambridge History of the Book in Britain Volume III 1400–1557. Cambridge: Cambridge University Press. pp. 576–607. ISBN 978-0-521-57346-7.
- Robert Browning: A life after death. Weidenfeld & Nicolson, London, 2004. ISBN 0297643967
- "Trollope, Frances (1779–1863)", Oxford Dictionary of National Biography, Oxford University Press, 2004.

=== Edited ===
Trollope, Fanny. (1997) Domestic manners of the Americans. London: Penguin. (With introduction and notes) ISBN 0140435611
