= Christina Swarns =

American lawyer for wrongful convictions

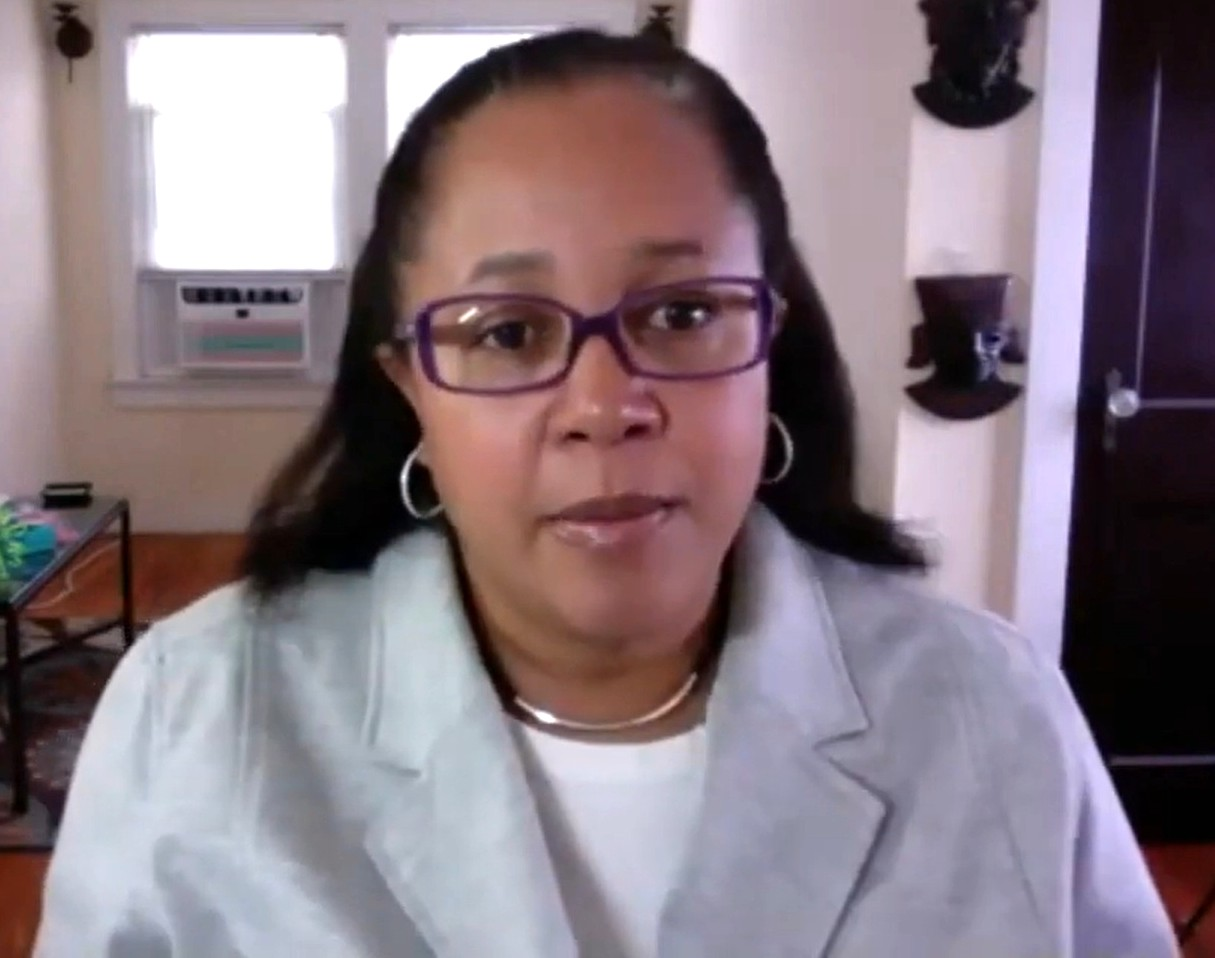
Swarns in 2021

Christina Allison Swarns is an American lawyer and the executive director of the Innocence Project since September 8, 2020. As of 2012, Swarns had seven convicted murderers taken off of death row, one of whom was exonerated, three had their convictions overturned, and three had their sentences vacated. She received national media attention after her U.S. Supreme Court victory in Buck v. Davis, a case that overturned a death sentence on the grounds of unfair racial bias.

== Early life and education ==
Christina grew up in Staten Island with her two sisters Jessica and Rachel. Her mother, a Caribbean immigrant from the Bahamas, is a retired superintendent for the New York Department of Education. Her father was a real estate broker. Her parents met while her father was at Howard University and when her mother was a student at what then was the District of Columbia Teachers College.

Christina attended Howard for her undergraduate education and received a B.A. in Political Science in 1990. Swarns then went on to receive her J.D. from the University of Pennsylvania Carey Law School in 1993.

== Early career ==
Six months after graduating from law school, Swarns began volunteering at the Legal Defense Fund. Recalling this experience, Swarns said, it was “the first time I felt I saw criminal law in its full capacity and power”. Swarns also worked with the Legal Aid Society and then the capital unit of the Philadelphia Federal Community Defender’s Office in the mid-1990s. In 2003, she accepted a position with the Legal Defense Fund. Before joining the Innocence Project, Swarns held positions as the Director of LDF’s Criminal Justice Project, Litigation Director of the NAACP Legal Defense & Educational Fund, Inc., and the Attorney-in-Charge of the Office of the Appellate Defender.

== Supreme Court victory ==
In 1997, Duane Buck, an African American man, was convicted of killing his ex-girlfriend, Debra Gardner, and one of her friends, Kenneth Butler, after arriving at her home armed with a rifle and shotgun on July 30, 1995. Additionally, Buck shot and wounded his stepsister, who was also at Gardener’s home at the time of the incident. In an ill-attempt to prove that Buck wouldn’t commit acts like these again, his court-appointed attorney, Jerry Guerinot, called two psychologists as expert witnesses. One of the psychologists, Dr. Walter Quijano, used Buck’s race as a factor in determining the likelihood that he would commit similar actions again. For these actions, a Texas trial court jury opted to give Buck the death sentence as opposed to a life sentence.

After undergoing many death penalty appeals on the basis of the violation of Buck’s 6th Amendment right to effective assistance of counsel, the case landed in the U.S. Supreme Court and was argued on October 5, 2016, with Christina Swarns as lead counsel. On February 22, 2017, the judgment was reversed and remanded in a 6-2 vote with Associate Justices Clarence Thomas and Samuel Alito dissenting. In reflection of the trial, Swarns said:

“I think it's a reminder given the history of race in the United States how that continues to play a powerful role and how it continues to influence decisions. And so that court's going forward have to be vigilant about making sure that kind of evidence is not admitted that it is not going to be tolerated by the United States Supreme Court”.

== Other notable cases ==
=== Nicholas James Yarris case ===
As an Assistant Federal Defender in the Capital Habeas Unit, Swarns was instrumental in using DNA evidence to exonerate Nick Yarris in 2003 from his convictions for the 1981 abduction, rape and murder of Linda May Craig that had put him on death row in Pennsylvania for over 20 years.

=== Abu-Jamal case ===
While working with the Legal Defense Fund, Swarns overturned Abu-Jamal's death sentence after the U.S. 3rd Circuit Court of Appeals ruled Abu-Jamal’s jury received flawed instructions and his death sentence was unconstitutional.

== Personal life ==
Christina has a daughter named Amina, who she adopted from Ethiopia as an infant.
