= Save the Last Dance for Me (disambiguation) =

"Save the Last Dance for Me" is a song first popularized by The Drifters in 1960.

Save the Last Dance for Me may also refer to:

- Save the Last Dance for Me (album) (1987), by Ben E. King
- Save the Last Dance for Me (TV series), 2004 South Korean drama
- Save the Last Dance for Me (musical), a 2012 musical
- "Save the Last Dance for Me" (1986), an episode of Cheers

== See also ==
- Save the Last Dance, a 2001 film
- "Save the Last Dance", a song by Union J from the 2013 album Union J
- "Save the Last Dance", a 2014 song by Anton Ewald
- "Save the Last Dance", a season 3 episode of That's So Raven
- Last Dance (disambiguation)
