= Stone Barn Castle =

Castle in New York, United States

Coordinates: 43°14′58.5″N 75°50′30″W

Stone Barn Castle is a private residence located in Oneida County, New York. (Note: Various sources site the building in Vienna, New York, Cleveland, New York, or Jewell, New York.) The building was initially built as a dairy farm in the early 20th-century. After closing around 1917, the building was without a permanent tenant until the 1970s, and severely damaged in a 1946 fire. From the 1970s to early 2000s, the building was restored and operated as a museum.

Since 2007, actor Adrien Brody has owned the building and used it as one of his private residences.

== History ==
Designed by Charles William Knight, the castle was completed in 1906, at a total cost of $140,000. Knight initially operated Stone Barn Castle as a dairy farm, but was unable to recoup the costs of building it and had to file for bankruptcy after around eleven years.

Attempts were made to convert the building to a country club or a night club, but both were unsuccessful. A fire destroyed much of the castle in 1946. For the next twenty years, the building continued to deteriorate and accumulate vandalism and graffiti.

The building was purchased in 1970 by Robert Hugel, who began restoring it with his wife, Alison. They operated the building as a museum, and hosted events on sitesuch as weddings and, around halloween, used the building as a 'haunted castle'. In 2003, the couple retired and transferred ownership to their son, William, and daughter, Catherine. He began efforts to redevelop the house into an art center, with a summer residency program. The Hugels sold the house to actor Adrien Brody in 2007 for $650,000. Brody spent has worked extensively on further renovating the house since purchasing it. A documentary about the renovation premiered at South by Southwest in March 2015.

Stone Barn Castle is not open to the public.
