= Heather Gilbert =

American theatrical lighting designer

- Born: Michigan, U.S.
- Website: Official website

Heather Gilbert is an American theatrical lighting designer. She is best known for her close collaboration with director David Cromer.

== Early life and education ==
Heather Gilbert was born in Michigan and raised in Houston, Texas. She received her BA from Trinity University in San Antonio and her MFA in Lighting Design from The Theatre School at DePaul University in Chicago.

== Career ==
Gilbert worked in Chicago for many years before relocating to Ann Arbor, Michigan, in 2025. In her early career, she was an assistant lighting designer to Scott Zielinski. Additionally, she worked closely with Kevin Rigdon and Brian MacDevitt. Gilbert soon became established in Chicago, calling Steppenwolf Theatre her artistic home.

Gilbert was a member of The Hypocrites, where David Cromer's staging of Thorton Wilder's Our Town originated, for which Gilbert designed the lights.

On Broadway, Gilbert has designed Bug, The Fear of 13, Little Bear Ridge Road, Good Night and Good Luck, Dead Outlaw, Parade, The Sound Inside, and Cult of Love.

Gilbert is a professor of lighting design at the University of Michigan's School of Music, Theatre, and Dance. Previously, she was a professor at Columbia College Chicago for 19 years and an assistant professor at Louisiana State University in Baton Rouge.

== Selected works ==
Year	Title	Role	Venue	Ref.
2009	Our Town	Lighting Designer	Off-Broadway, Barrow Street Theatre	
2018	The Better Half	Lighting Designer	Chicago, Lucky Plush at Steppenwolf Theatre Company	
2018	The Pirates of Penzance	Lighting Designer	Regional, Olney Theatre Center	
2019	Dance Nation	Lighting Designer	Chicago, Steppenwolf Theatre Company	
2019	Ms Blakk for President	Lighting Designer	Chicago, Steppenwolf Theatre Company	
2019	The Sound Inside	Lighting Designer	Broadway, Studio 54	
2021	Bug	Lighting Designer	Chicago, Steppenwolf Theatre Company	
2022	Layalina	Lighting Designer	Chicago, Goodman Theatre's New Stages Festival	
2022	The Color Purple	Lighting Designer	Regional, The Muny	
2022	Wife of a Salesman	Lighting Designer	Chicago, Writers Theatre	
2023	POTUS: Or, Behind Every Great Dumbass Are Seven Women Trying to Keep Him Alive	Lighting Designer	Chicago, Steppenwolf Theatre	
2023	Rent (musical)	Lighting Designer	Regional, The Muny	
2023	Another Marriage	Lighting Designer	Chicago, Steppenwolf Theatre	
2023	Parade	Lighting Designer	Broadway, Bernard B. Jacobs Theatre	
2024	Primary Trust	Lighting Designer	Chicago, Goodman Theatre	
2024	Leroy and Lucy	Lighting Designer	Chicago, Steppenwolf Theatre Company	
2024	Waitress	Lighting Designer	Regional, The Muny	
2024	Cult of Love	Lighting Designer	Off-Broadway, Second Stage Theater	
2025	Lowcountry	Lighting Designer	Off-Broadway, Atlantic Theater Company	
2025	Dead Outlaw	Lighting Designer	Broadway, Longacre Theatre	
2025	Good Night, and Good Luck	Lighting Designer	Broadway, Winter Garden Theatre	
2025	Little Bear Ridge Road	Lighting Designer	Broadway, Booth Theatre	
2026	Bug	Lighting Designer	Broadway, Samuel J. Friedman Theatre	
2026	Hedda Gabler	Lighting Designer	West End, Old Globe Theatre	
2026	The Fear of 13	Lighting Designer	Broadway, James Earl Jones Theatre	
2026	Girl, Interrupted	Lighting Designer	Off-Broadway, The Public Theater	
2026	Midnight at the Never Get	Lighting Designer	West End, Menier Chocolate Factory	
2026	Downstate		Broadway, Booth Theatre	

== Awards and nominations ==
Year	Award	Category	Production	Result	Ref.
2020	Drama Desk Award	Outstanding Lighting Design for a Play	The Sound Inside	Won	
2021	Tony Award	Best Lighting Design of a Play	The Sound Inside	Nominated	
2023	Tony Award	Best Lighting Design of a Musical	Parade	Nominated	
2023	Drama Desk Award	Outstanding Lighting Design for a Musical	Parade	Nominated	
2025	Tony Award	Best Lighting Design of a Play	Good Night, and Good Luck	Nominated	
2025	Drama Desk Award	Outstanding Lighting Design	Dead Outlaw	Nominated	
2026	Tony Award	Best Lighting Design of a Play	Bug	Nominated	
2026	Tony Award	Best Lighting Design of a Play	The Fear of 13	Nominated	
