= One Last Dance =

One Last Dance may refer to:

== Film and TV ==
- One Last Dance (2003 film), a film starring Patrick Swayze
- One Last Dance (2006 film), a Singaporean film directed by Max Makowski
- "One Last Dance" (Spooks), an episode of British series Spooks
- ”One Last Dance”, an episode of Dance Moms

== Music ==
- One Last Dance, a 1991 large-ensemble work by composer Kamran Ince

=== Songs ===
- "One Last Dance" (R5 song), from the album Louder, 2005
- "One Last Dance", a song by Badly Drawn Boy from Born in the U.K., 2006
- "One Last Dance", a song by Craig David from The Story Goes..., 2005
- "One Last Dance", a song by Alyssa Milano from Do You See Me?, 1992
- "One Last Dance", a song by Silverstein from Short Songs, 2011
- "One Last Dance", a song by The Red Hot Valentines, 2000

== See also ==
- "Just One Last Dance", a song by Sarah Connor
- Last Dance (disambiguation)
