= John Ferrentino =

American comedian

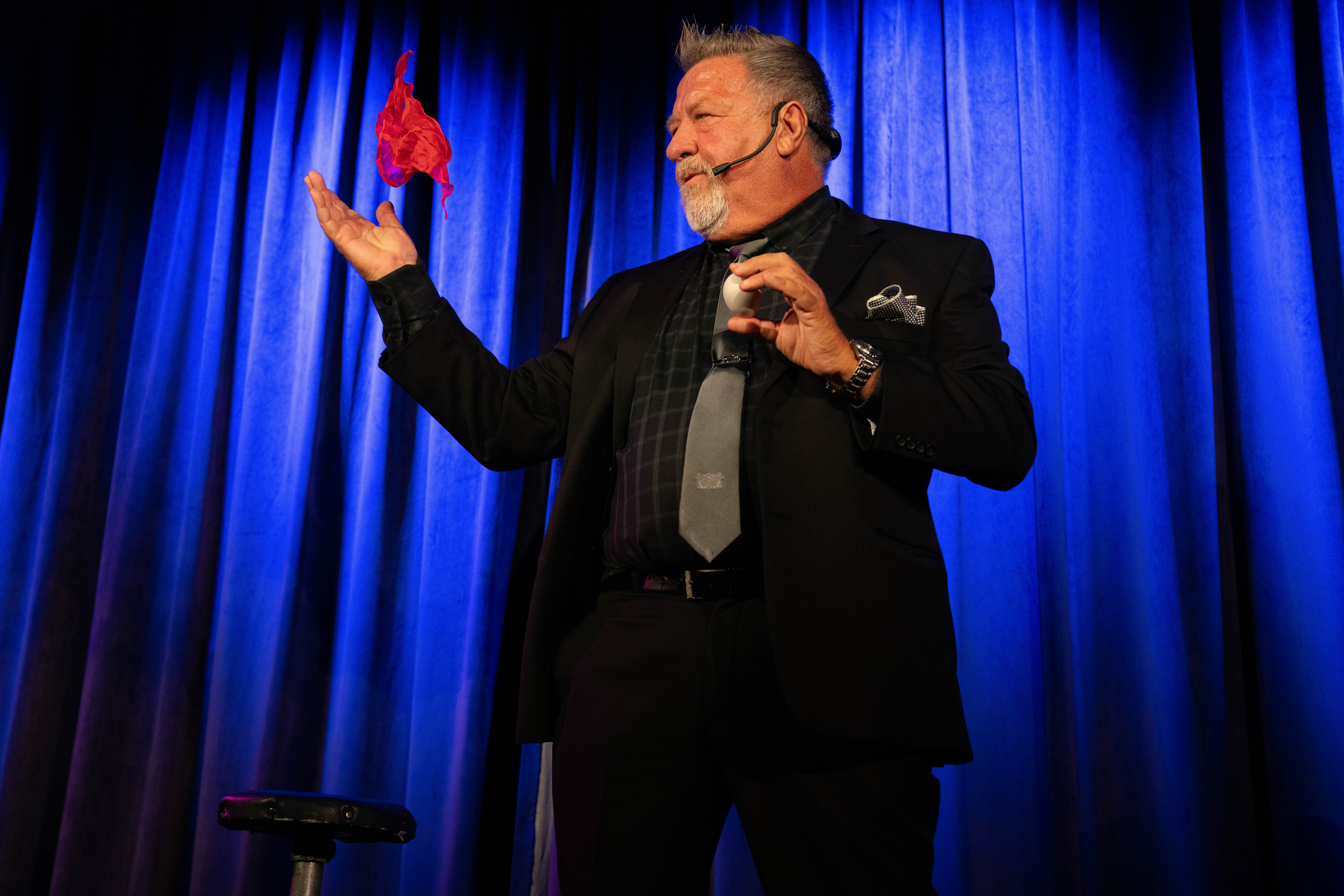
- Ferrentino Performing
- Born: Long Island, New York
- Occupations: Comedian, comedy magician
- Children: Lindsey Ferrentino, Jonathan Ferrentino

John Ferrentino is an American comedian and comedy magician. He was born and raised in Long Island, New York. He has made several television appearances (including HBO, VH1, the Comedy Channel, A&E, and Showtime). For five years, he was a regular guest on Fox's Comic Strip Live, and for ten years he toured as the opening act for Crosby, Stills & Nash. He was also a regular on Comedy Tonight on the Fox Network.

== Career ==
John Ferrentino began his career as the comic relief at the hospital he was working in as an x-ray technician, and soon began frequenting a club in Massapequa, Long Island called The White House.

For 44 years, he performed thousands of shows across the country and made over fifty television appearances. He toured the world with Crosby, Stills, & Nash, before continuing to travel and perform on every major cruise line. He is also a regular performer at the Magic Castle in Hollywood, has invented magic tricks, written three books about magic (including Comedy Clubs for All Magicians)

Additionally, Ferrentino has been a regular at The MGM Grand in Las Vegas, and performed at the World Summit of Magic in Washington DC.

Recently, Ferrentino returned to Los Angeles to perform at the Magic Castle in Hollywood. in 2015, he created a new show called "Do Spirits Return" with less emphasis on comedy and more on history, with original magic invented for the show and an element of paranormal. It was based on "The Waverly Hills Sanatorium".

The show and lecture was performed in theaters, magic conventions, and was taught as a course at Jeff McBrides Magic and Mystery School in Las Vegas.

Notable comedians Ferrentino has performed alongside include: Rosie O’Donald, Kevin James, Ray Romano, and Eddie Murphy and he has also opened for Jay Leno, Chicago, and Huey Lewis and the News. Announcements of his shows have been featured in New York Magazine and The New York Times. He has also been featured in the international magic magazine, Vanish.

Podcasts and videos of Ferrentino are found on podbay, iHeartRadio, iTunes, stitcher.com, The Magic Cafe, Laughing Out Loud: America's Funniest Comedians Vol. 5 (also featured in this DVD are Jerry Seinfeld, Brad Garrett, Kelsey Grammer, Adam Sandler, Max Alexander, John Caponera, John Ferrentino, Judy Tenuta, Carol Leifer, Jeff Foxworthy, and Rosie O'Donnell).
