= Buck v. Davis =

- Supreme Court of the United States

Argued October 5, 2016 Decided February 22, 2017
- Full case name: Duane Edward Buck v. Lorie Davis, Director, Texas Department of Criminal Justice, Correctional Institutions Division
- Docket no.: 15-8049
- Citations: 580 U.S. 100 (more) 137 S. Ct. 759; 197 L. Ed. 2d 1

Case history
- Prior: Buck v. Stephens, 623 F. App'x 668 (5th Cir. 2015); cert. granted, 136 S. Ct. 2409 (2016).
- Procedural: On writ of certiorari to the United States Court of Appeals for the Fifth Circuit
- Subsequent: 865 F.3d 215 (5th Cir. 2017)

Holding
- An ineffective assistance of counsel claim is likely appropriate when a criminal defendant's attorney enters evidence that the defendant is likely to be a future danger because of his race and the defendant's sentence was probably based on this evidence.

Court membership
- Chief Justice John Roberts Associate Justices Anthony Kennedy · Clarence Thomas; Ruth Bader Ginsburg · Stephen Breyer; Samuel Alito · Sonia Sotomayor; Elena Kagan

Case opinions
- Majority: Roberts, joined by Kennedy, Ginsburg, Breyer, Sotomayor, Kagan
- Dissent: Thomas, joined by Alito

Laws applied
- U.S. Const. amend. VI

Buck v. Davis, 580 U.S. 100 (2017), was a case in which the United States Supreme Court reversed the death sentence of the defendant Duane Buck after the defendant's attorney introduced evidence that suggested the defendant would be more likely to commit violent acts in the future because he was black.

== Opinion of the Court ==
In a 6-2 opinion written by Chief Justice John Roberts, the Court held that the defendant was denied effective assistance of counsel under Strickland v. Washington. Chief Justice Roberts' ruling rejected the District Court's argument that the discussion of race at trial was de minimis and therefore not prejudicial. Rather, Chief Justice Roberts wrote: "when a jury hears expert testimony that expressly makes a defendant’s race directly pertinent on the question of life or death, the impact of that evidence cannot be measured simply by how much air time it received at trial or how many pages it occupies in the record. Some toxins can be deadly in small doses."

== See also ==
- List of United States Supreme Court cases
- Lists of United States Supreme Court cases by volume
- List of United States Supreme Court cases by the Roberts Court
