= Adrien Brody =

American actor and visual artist (born 1973)

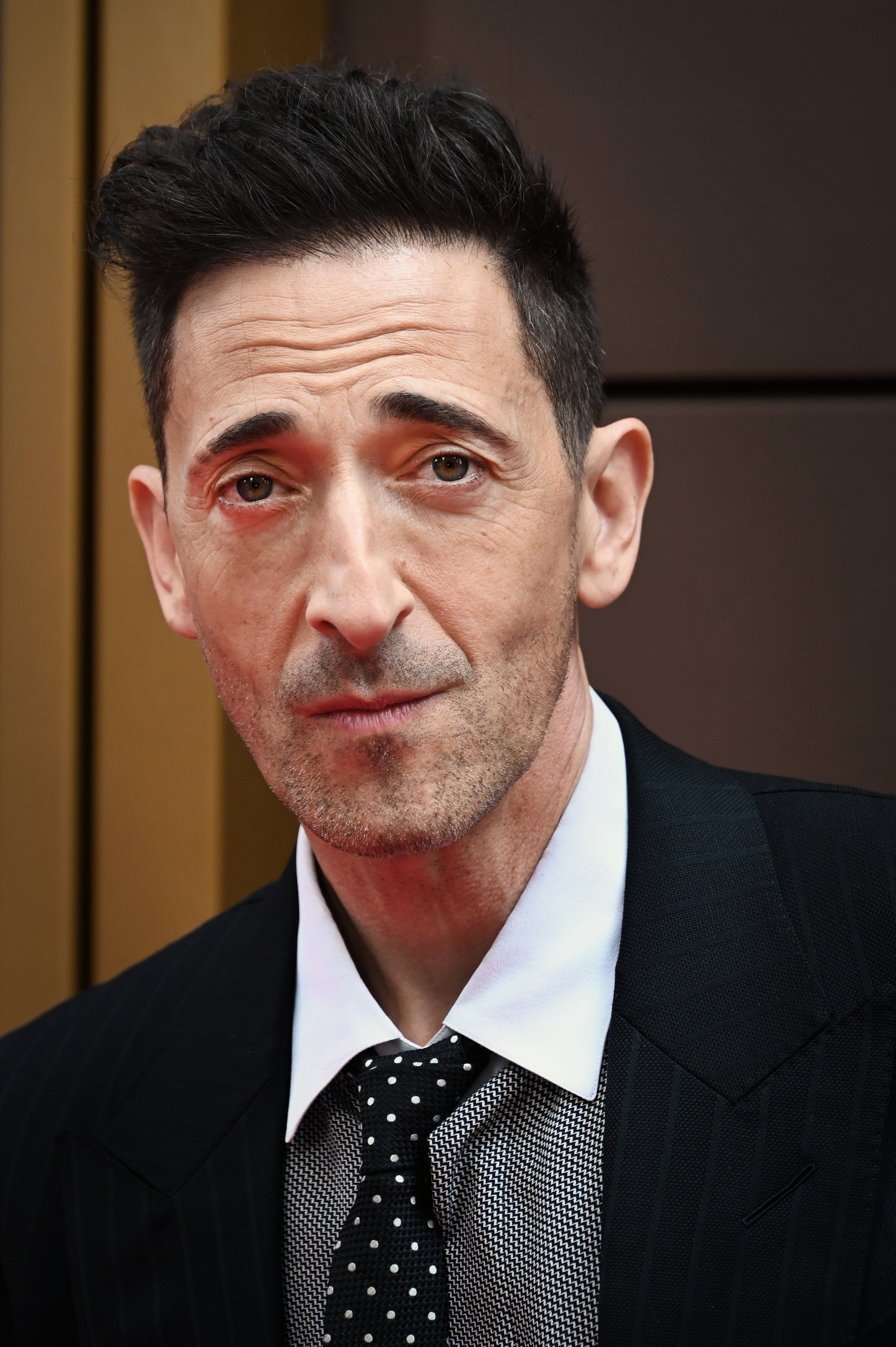
- Brody in 2026
- Born: Adrien Nicholas Brody; April 14, 1973 (age 53); Queens, New York City, U.S.
- Education: City University of New York
- Occupation: Actor
- Years active: 1988–present
- Partner: Georgina Chapman (2019–present)
- Mother: Sylvia Plachy
- Awards: Full list

Adrien Nicholas Brody (born April 14, 1973) is an American actor known for portraying intense, emotionally charged characters in both leading and supporting roles. In 2025, Time magazine listed him as one of the world's 100 most influential people.

Brody started his career in the early 1990s, taking roles in King of the Hill (1993), The Thin Red Line (1998), and Summer of Sam (1999). Brody won two Academy Awards for Best Actor for portraying the Polish Jewish pianist Władysław Szpilman in Roman Polanski's war drama The Pianist (2002) and a Hungarian architect in Brady Corbet's period epic The Brutalist (2024); his first win, at age 29, made him the youngest winner in the category, and, to date, the only winner under the age of thirty. For his performance in The Pianist, he also won a César Award, and for his work in The Brutalist, he also won the BAFTA Award and the Golden Globe Award for Best Actor.

His other notable films include The Village (2004), King Kong (2005), Hollywoodland (2006), Cadillac Records (2008), Splice (2009), Predators (2010), Midnight in Paris (2011), and Blonde (2022). He has collaborated with filmmaker Wes Anderson numerous times acting in The Darjeeling Limited (2007), Fantastic Mr. Fox (2009), The Grand Budapest Hotel (2014), The French Dispatch (2021), and Asteroid City (2023).

On television, Brody has played Luca Changretta in the fourth season of the BBC series Peaky Blinders (2017), and Pat Riley in the HBO sports drama series Winning Time: The Rise of the Lakers Dynasty (2022–2023). He earned nominations for Outstanding Lead Actor in a Limited Series or Movie and Outstanding Guest Actor in a Drama Series at the Primetime Emmy Awards for his respective roles as Harry Houdini in the History Channel miniseries Houdini (2014) and investor Josh Aaronson in the HBO series Succession (2021).

On stage, Brody made his London theatre debut in 2024 and Broadway debut in 2025 portraying death row inmate Nick Yarris in the Lindsey Ferrentino play The Fear of 13 (2024), garnering a nomination for the Laurence Olivier Award for Best Actor for the former.

== Early life and education ==
Adrien Nicholas Brody was born on April 14, 1973, in Woodhaven, Queens, New York City, the son of Sylvia Plachy, a photographer, and Elliot Brody, a retired history professor and painter. Brody's father is of Polish Jewish descent. Brody's mother was born in Budapest, Hungary, and emigrated to the U.S. from Austria in 1958, to which she had fled with her parents following the Hungarian Revolution of 1956 and having lost most of her relatives to the Holocaust; she was raised Catholic, and is the daughter of a Catholic Hungarian aristocrat father and a Czech Jewish mother. Brody has said he was raised "without a strong connection" to either Judaism or Christianity.

As a child, Brody performed magic shows at children's birthday parties as "The Amazing Adrien". He attended I.S. 145 Joseph Pulitzer Middle School and Fiorello H. LaGuardia High School of Music & Art and Performing Arts in New York. He attended summer camp at Long Lake Camp for the Arts in the Adirondacks in upstate New York. Brody attended Stony Brook University before transferring to Queens College for a semester.

== Career ==
=== 1989–2002: Beginnings and breakthrough ===
Taking acting classes as a child, by age thirteen, Brody appeared in an Off-Broadway play and a PBS television film. His breakthrough came with a supporting role in Steven Soderbergh's King of the Hill (1993), a critically acclaimed drama often recognized as a pivotal moment in his early career, with both critics and Brody himself citing it as his big break. In 1996, he starred alongside Tupac Shakur and Mickey Rourke in Bullet. Brody hovered on the brink of stardom, earning an Independent Spirit Award nomination for his performance in the 1998 film Restaurant and receiving praise for his roles in Terrence Malick's The Thin Red Line and Spike Lee's Summer of Sam (1999).

Director Roman Polanski, impressed by Brody's work in Harrison's Flowers (2000), cast him in the lead role in The Pianist (2002). To prepare for the role, Brody withdrew from public life for months, gave up his apartment and his car, and took piano lessons for four hours a day until he could master passages from some of Chopin's finest works. At 6 ft 1 in (1.85 m) tall, he lost 30 pounds (14 kg), dropping him to 130 lb (59 kg). The role won him an Academy Award for Best Actor, making him, at age twenty-nine, the youngest actor ever to win the award, and, to date, the only winner under the age of thirty. He also won a César Award for his performance. The role also earned him Best Actor nominations at the BAFTA, Golden Globes, and SAG Awards; Brody did not win any of these prizes, making him one of few actors to win an Oscar and no major precursor awards for a performance.

=== 2003–2013: Post-The Pianist work ===
After The Pianist, Brody appeared in four distinctively different films. In Dummy (released in 2003, but originally shot in 2000, just prior to his work in The Pianist), he portrayed Steven Schoichet, a socially awkward aspiring ventriloquist in pursuit of a love interest (his employment counsellor, played by Vera Farmiga). He learned ventriloquism and puppetry for the role (under the tutelage of actor and ventriloquist Alan Semok) convincingly enough to perform all of the voice stunts and puppet manipulation live on set in real time, with no subsequent post dubbing. He played Noah Percy, a mentally disabled young man, in the film The Village, by M. Night Shyamalan, shell-shocked war veteran Jack Starks in The Jacket, writer Jack Driscoll in the 2005 King Kong remake, and father-to-be Peter Whitman in The Darjeeling Limited by Wes Anderson. King Kong was both a critical and box office success—it grossed $550 million worldwide, and is Brody's most successful film to date, financially. He reprised his role voicing Driscoll in the video game adaptation of the film. Additionally, Brody played a detective in Hollywoodland. He has also appeared in Diet Coke and Schweppes commercials, as well as Tori Amos' music video for "A Sorta Fairytale".

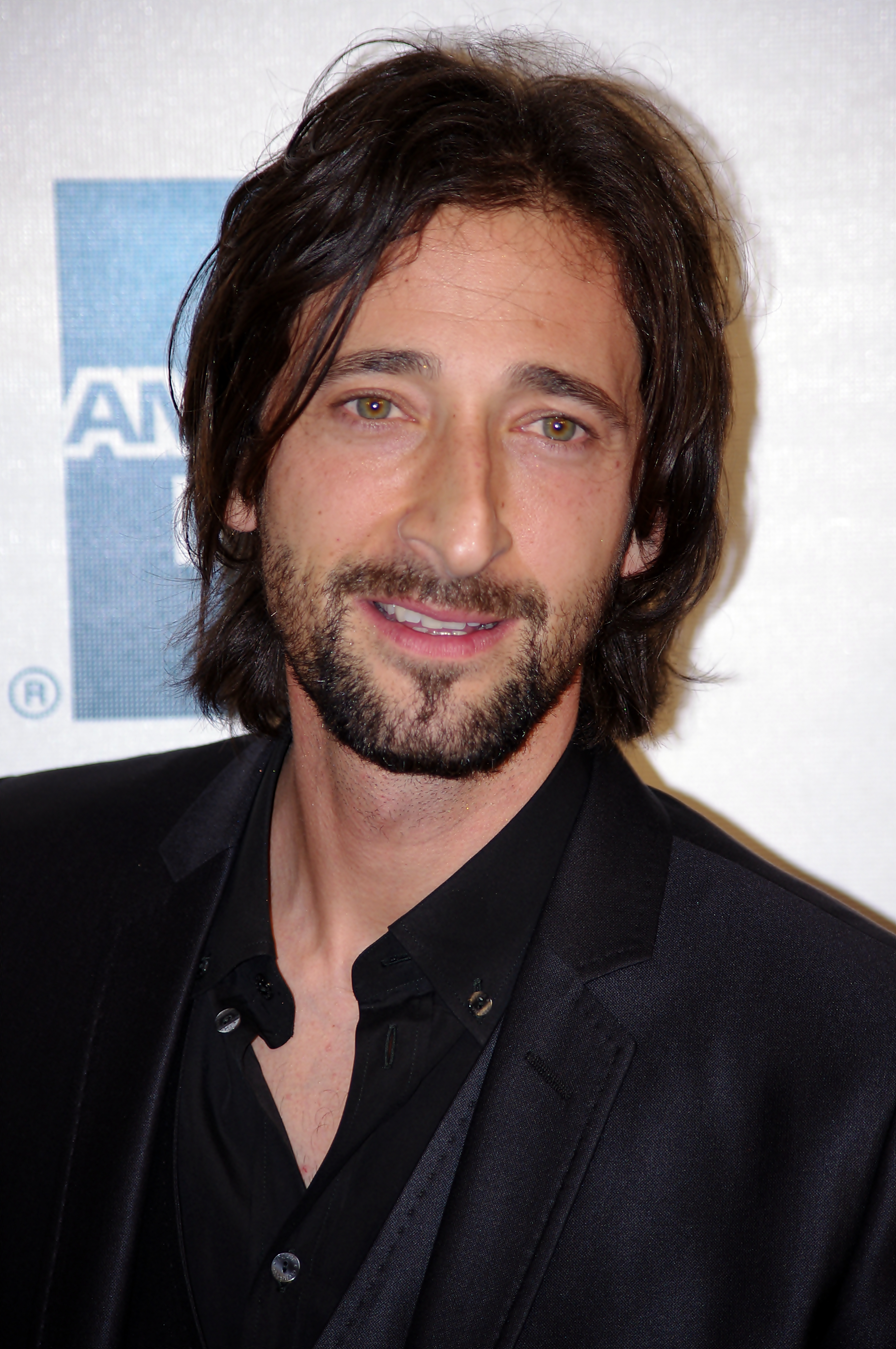
Brody at the 2011 Tribeca Film Festival

On January 5, 2006, Brody confirmed speculation that he was interested in playing the role of The Joker in 2008's The Dark Knight, and also met with director Christopher Nolan. However, Nolan and Warner Bros. decided instead to cast Heath Ledger in the role. He was also in talks with Paramount to play Spock in J. J. Abrams' Star Trek, but it ultimately went to Zachary Quinto. In 2009, he starred in Splice, a science-fiction film written and directed by Vincenzo Natali. Originally a Sundance film, Splice was adopted by Dark Castle Entertainment and distributed by Warner Bros. In 2010, he played the star role of Royce in Predators (a sequel to the original Predator), directed by Nimród Antal and produced by Robert Rodriguez.

In 2011, Brody starred in a Stella Artois beer commercial called "Crying Jean" that premiered right after half-time of Super Bowl XLV as part of Stella's "She Is a Thing of Beauty" campaign. He appeared in Woody Allen's 2011 Academy Award–winning comedy, Midnight in Paris as Salvador Dalí. On January 16, 2012, Brody made his debut as a runway model for Prada Men Fall/Winter 2012 show.

=== 2014–present: Resurgence and expansion ===
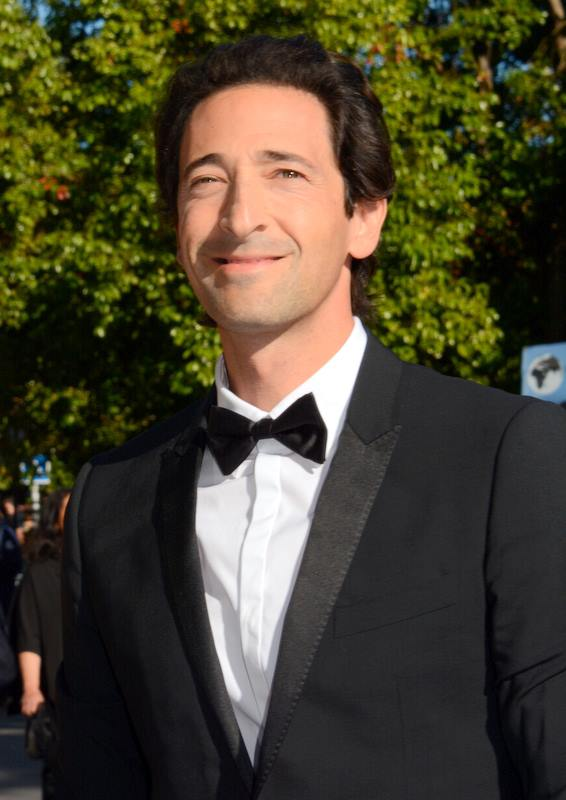
Brody at the 2014 Cannes Film Festival

In 2014, Brody collaborated again with Wes Anderson in the Academy Award–winning The Grand Budapest Hotel, where he played the villain Dmitri. He received an Emmy Award nomination for Outstanding Lead Actor in a Miniseries or in a Movie for portraying the title character in Houdini, a History Channel miniseries. The same year, Brody was cast as the title role of Lee Tamahori's action epic Emperor, about a young woman seeking revenge for the execution of her father by Holy Roman Emperor Charles V, opposite Sophie Cookson. The movie was finished and screened at Cannes in 2017 but its release has been held up by legal challenges.

In 2015, he starred as Tiberius in the Chinese film Dragon Blade, which grossed $54.8 million in its opening week in China. He also received the Cinema Vanguard award at the San Diego Film Festival the same year. In 2017, it was announced that he would join the cast of the fourth season of the BBC crime drama Peaky Blinders. On August 4, 2017, he received the Leopard Club Award at the Locarno Festival. The Leopard Club Award pays homage to a major film personality whose work has made a lasting impact on the collective imagination. In 2019, Brody left Paradigm to sign with CAA Creative Artists Agency. In 2021, he received the Vanguard Award at SCAD's Savannah Film Festival.

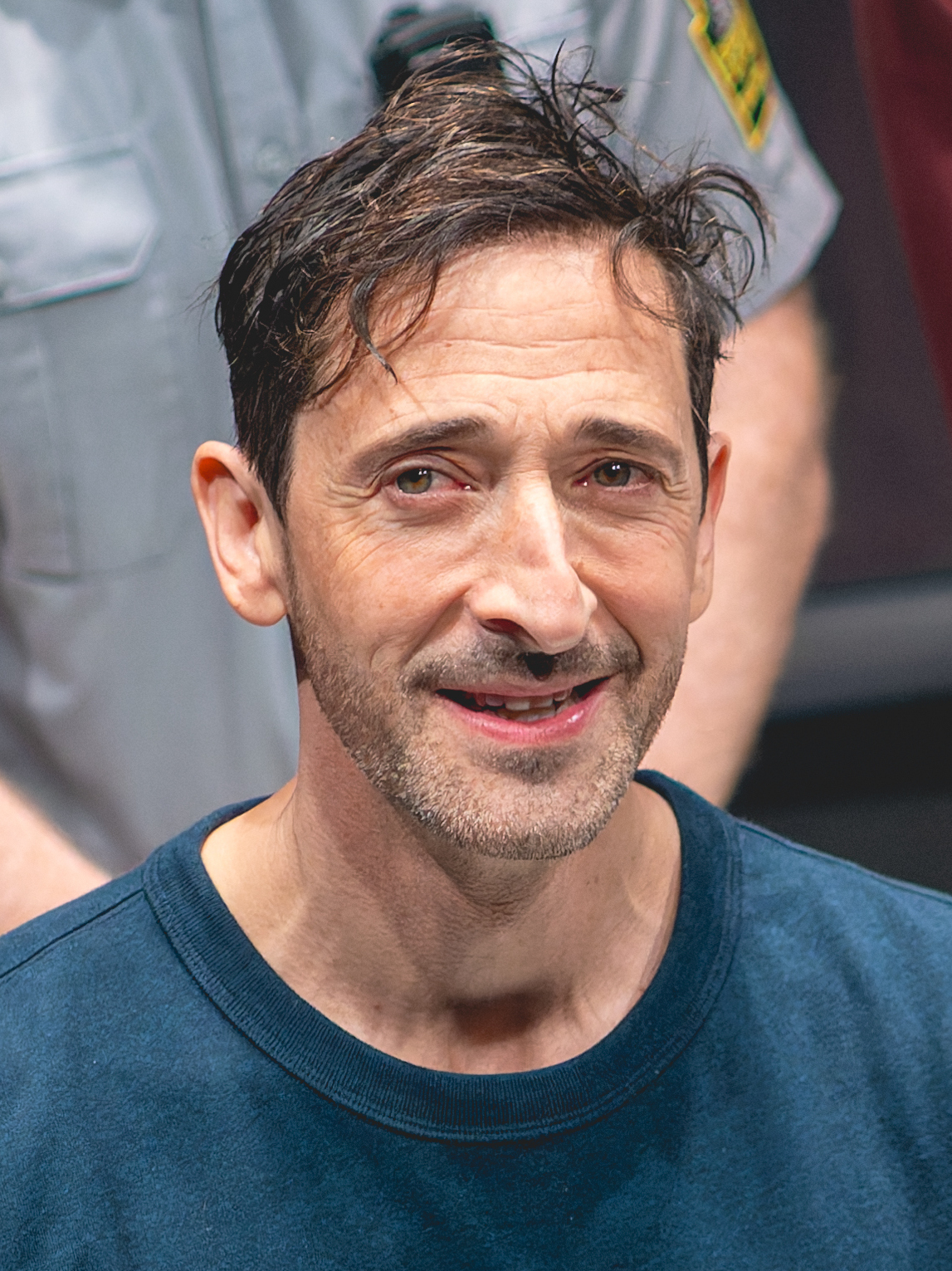
Brody at the Donmar Warehouse in 2024.

In 2024, Brody starred in Brady Corbet's The Brutalist, replacing Joel Edgerton in the lead role and joining an ensemble cast consisting of Felicity Jones, Guy Pearce, Joe Alwyn, Jonathan Hyde, Emma Laird, and Peter Polycarpou. Brody's performance in the film as the Hungarian-Jewish Holocaust survivor László Tóth was critically acclaimed, with many critics praising his subtlety and stating that it was his finest performance since The Pianist. For his performance he won the Oscar, BAFTA, Golden Globe, and Critics Choice Award.

Brody starred in a stage play, The Fear of 13, written by Lindsey Ferrentino, at the Donmar Warehouse in London in October–November 2024. The play is based on the true story of Nick Yarris, an exonerated death-row inmate from Pennsylvania. For his performance he was nominated for the Laurence Olivier Award for Best Actor. He reprised the role in 2026 on Broadway acting alongside Tessa Thompson at the James Earl Jones Theatre.

== Personal life ==
In 1992, Brody was seriously injured in a motorcycle collision in which he was thrown over a car and crashed headfirst into a crosswalk. He spent months recuperating. He has broken his nose three times doing stunts, including during the filming of Summer of Sam. Brody lived in Los Angeles during his early career and now is based in Manhattan.

In 2009, he signed the Free Roman Polanski petition.

In 2010, the band Lemon Demon released the song "BRODYQUEST", which became popular online. Brody enjoyed the song, setting it as his ringtone at one point. He further described the song as "hilarious."

It was reported in 2024 that Brody suffers post-traumatic stress disorder from the extreme weight loss he endured for The Pianist in 2002.

In 2010, Brody sued makers of the film Giallo, alleging they failed to pay his full salary. In January 2011 it was reported that Brody had reached a settlement with the producers. He said, "I very much enjoyed the process of making Giallo and am happy that things have been resolved and that people can now enjoy seeing the film."

=== Romantic relationships ===
Brody began dating Spanish actress and model Elsa Pataky in 2006. For her 31st birthday, in July 2007, he purchased for her an early 20th-century farm in central New York State, which had been designed to look like a castle. Brody and Pataky were featured at their New York home in a 35-page spread for Hello! magazine in October 2008. The pair broke up in 2009.

For six years, Brody was in a relationship with Russian model Lara Lieto, after meeting at the Cannes Film Festival in 2012.

In February 2020, it was reported that he was romantically involved with English fashion designer and actress Georgina Chapman, whom he began dating while she was still married to, but formally separated from, Harvey Weinstein.

=== Oscar kiss ===
At the 75th Academy Awards in 2003, Brody became the subject of significant attention while receiving his Best Actor Oscar for The Pianist when he passionately kissed the presenter, actress Halle Berry. The kiss was widely viewed as the 2003 Oscars' signature moment. (Note: Over time, views have changed to point out that the kiss probably wasn't consensual toward Berry as she wasn't aware that he would do it, though Berry herself has never explicitly said she didn't consent. In a 2017 interview on Watch What Happens Live with Andy Cohen she said she willingly went with it understanding the emotions of the moment. Weeks before the 97th Academy Awards, Brody acknowledged that modern views have changed and that he had never intended to offend Berry.) While Berry was surprised, she has since said she was proud to be a part of his big moment, called the kiss "great" in the week after the ceremony, and had been waiting to recreate it throughout the years if they crossed paths at an awards show. The following year, as Brody presented Best Actress at the 76th Academy Awards, Brody joked about the kiss using breath spray before announcing Charlize Theron, who eventually kissed Brody on the way to the stage. When announcing the nominees for the 77th Academy Awards, Brody came on stage and jokingly leaned in to kiss Academy president Frank Pierson, which Pierson rejected.

In January 2025, Berry congratulated Brody on his Instagram for winning the Golden Globe Award for Best Actor for his performance in The Brutalist. "Congratulations my friend. You are truly one of one!" On the 97th Academy Awards red carpet, Berry ran over and passionately kissed Brody in a reprise of the moment from twenty-two years before. His girlfriend, Georgina Chapman, had given Berry permission prior to it and celebrated the moment with them.

== Acting credits ==
Key
†	May Denote works that have not yet been released

=== Film ===
Year	Title	Role	Notes
1989	New York Stories	Mel	Segment: "Life Without Zoe"
1991	The Boy Who Cried Bitch	Eddie	
1993	King of the Hill	Lester Silverstone	
1994	Angels in the Outfield	Danny Hemmerling	
1995	Ten Benny	Ray DiGiovanni	
1996	Bullet	Ruby Stein	
1996	Solo	Dr. Bill Stewart	
1997	The Last Time I Committed Suicide	Ben	
1997	The Undertaker's Wedding	Mario Bellini	
1997	Six Ways to Sunday	Arnie Finklestein	
1998	Restaurant	Chris Calloway	
1998	The Thin Red Line	Cpl. Geoffrey Fife	
1999	Summer of Sam	Ritchie Tringale	
1999	Oxygen	Harry Houdini	
1999	Liberty Heights	Van Kurtzman	
2000	Bread and Roses	Sam Shapiro	
2000	Harrison's Flowers	Kyle Morris	
2001	Love the Hard Way	Jack Grace	
2001	The Affair of the Necklace	Count Nicolas De La Motte	
2002	Dummy	Steven Schoichet	
2002	The Pianist	Władysław Szpilman	Academy Award for Best Actor
2003	The Singing Detective	First Hood	
2004	The Village	Noah Percy	
2005	The Jacket	Jack Starks	
2005	King Kong	Jack Driscoll	
2006	Hollywoodland	Louis Simo	Also additional cinematographer
2007	The Darjeeling Limited	Peter Whitman	
2008	Manolete	Manolete	
2008	The Brothers Bloom	Bloom	
2008	Cadillac Records	Leonard Chess	
2009	Giallo	Inspector Enzo Avolfi	Also producer
2009	Splice	Clive Nicoli	
2009	Fantastic Mr. Fox	Rickity	Voice
2010	High School	Edward "Psycho Ed" Highbaugh	
2010	Predators	Royce	
2010	The Experiment	Travis Cacksmackberg	
2010	Wrecked	Man	Also executive producer
2011	Detachment	Henry Barthes	Also executive producer
2011	Midnight in Paris	Salvador Dalí	
2012	Back to 1942	Theodore White	
2013	Inappropriate Comedy	Flirty Harry	Also wrote additional dialogue
2013	Third Person	Scott Lowry	
2014	The Grand Budapest Hotel	Dmitri Desgoffe und Taxis	
2014	American Heist	Frankie Kelly	Also executive producer
2015	Dragon Blade	Tiberius	
2015	Stone Barn Castle	—N/a	Documentary; Director, producer and composer
2015	Backtrack	Peter Bower	
2015	Septembers of Shiraz	Isaac Amin	Also executive producer
2016	Manhattan Night	Porter Wren	Also producer
2016	Come Together	Ralph	Short film
2017	Emperor	Charles V	Unreleased
2017	Bullet Head	Stacy	
2018	Air Strike	Steve	
2021	Clean	Clean	Also co-writer, producer and composer
2021	The French Dispatch	Julien Cadazio	
2022	See How They Run	Leo Köpernick	
2022	Blonde	Arthur Miller	
2023	Manodrome	Dad Dan	
2023	Ghosted	Leveque	
2023	Fool's Paradise	Chad Luxt	
2023	Asteroid City	Schubert Green	
2024	The Brutalist	László Tóth	Academy Award for Best Actor
TBA	Last Dance †	Elliot	
TBA	Snake Island †		

=== Television ===
Year	Title	Role	Notes
1988	Home at Last	Billy	Television film
1988	Annie McGuire	Lenny McGuire	Episode: "Annie and the Brooklyn Bridge"
1994	Rebel Highway	Skinny	Episode: "Jailbreakers"
1996	Bullet Hearts	Chuckie Bragg	Pilot
2003	Saturday Night Live	Himself (host)	Episode: "Adrien Brody/Sean Paul, Wayne Wonder"
2014	Houdini	Harry Houdini	Miniseries; 2 episodes
2015	Breakthrough	Narrator	Episode: "Decoding the Brain"
2016	Dice	Himself	Episode: "Ego"
2017	Peaky Blinders	Luca Changretta	6 episodes
2021	Chapelwaite	Captain Charles Boone	10 episodes
2021	Succession	Josh Aaronson	2 episodes
2022–2023	Winning Time: The Rise of the Lakers Dynasty	Pat Riley	15 episodes
2023	Poker Face	Sterling Frost Jr.	2 episodes

=== Theater ===
Year	Title	Role	Venue
2024	The Fear of 13	Nick Yarris	Donmar Warehouse, Off West End
2026	The Fear of 13	Nick Yarris	James Earl Jones Theatre, Broadway

=== Video games ===
Year	Title	Role	Notes
2005	Peter Jackson's King Kong	Jack Driscoll	Voice; Spike Video Game Award for Best Cast

=== Music videos ===
Year	Title	Role	Notes
2002	"A Sorta Fairytale"	Tori Amos's lover	
2023	"Déjame Entrar"	Rauw's friend	

== See also ==
- List of oldest and youngest Academy Awards winners and nominees — Youngest winners for Best Lead Actor
- List of Jewish Academy Award winners and nominees
- List of actors with Academy Award nominations
- List of actors with two or more Academy Awards in acting categories
- List of actors nominated for Academy Awards for non-English performances
- List of Golden Globe winners
- List of Queens College people
