= Duane Buck =

African American defendant in Supreme Court case

- Born: July 5, 1963 (age 63)
- Status: Incarcerated at O. B. Ellis Unit
- Known for: Buck v. Davis
- Convictions: Capital murder Attempted capital murder (2 counts)
- Penalty: Death; commuted to life imprisonment with the possibility of parole after 40 years

Details
- Victims: Debra Gardner; Kenneth Butler

Duane Edward Buck (born July 5, 1963) is an African-American man formerly on death row following his conviction for the shooting deaths of his ex-girlfriend Debra Gardner and her friend Kenneth Butler. He also wounded his sister, who was also at Gardner's home.

His sentence was commuted from death to life in prison after the Supreme Court case Buck v. Davis.

== Trial ==
Buck was tried for the 1995 shooting deaths of his ex-girlfriend, Debra Gardner, and her friend Kenneth Butler. At trial, psychologist Walter Quijano was a defense witness. At one point during his testimony, Quijano said that black people were statistically more likely to commit violence.

At the sentencing hearing, the prosecutor used the psychologist's statements to argue that Buck posed a risk of future violence. "You heard from Dr. Quijano, who had a lot of experience in the Texas Department of Corrections, who told you that there was a probability that the man would commit future acts of violence." (In Texas, the jury must first unanimously agree that the defendant poses a "continuing threat to society" in order for a death sentence to be imposed.)

== Subsequent proceedings ==
The psychologist's assertion about black offenders was the cornerstone of Buck's death penalty appeal: that his sentencing was racially biased. In 2000 Texas Attorney General John Cornyn recommended that six cases, including Buck's case, be reviewed for racially biased testimony. Buck's case was not reviewed; the other five cases were reviewed but all of those offenders were sentenced to death again because the testimony was found to be only a small part of each trial.

Buck was scheduled to be executed on September 15, 2011; however, the Supreme Court of the United States granted a stay of the process.

In response to Buck's case, the justices conceded that the testimony of Quijano "would provide a basis for reversal of [Buck's] sentence if the prosecution were responsible for presenting that testimony to the jury." However, Quijano was a defense witness, and it was Buck's attorney who elicited the correlation between race and future risk for criminal actions. Retired Justice John Paul Stevens commented that he believed the decision would be different if the prosecution presented the testimony. Sonia Sotomayor described Buck's death sentence as "marred by racial overtones" that "our criminal justice system should not tolerate." Sotomayor and Justice Elena Kagan dissented from the denial.

On August 20, 2015, the United States Court of Appeals for the Fifth Circuit rejected hearing the question of race being allowed as a deciding factor for executing the guilty. The 5th denied a certificate of appealability because Buck did not show extraordinary circumstances.

The United States Supreme Court granted certiorari and, on October 5, 2016, heard oral argument as to whether the Fifth Circuit imposed an improper and unduly burdensome Certificate of Appealability standard. On October 3, 2017, Buck was resentenced to life in prison with parole eligibility after 40 years plus two concurrent 60-year terms for attempted murder. He will become eligible for parole in 2035.

== See also ==
- List of death row inmates in the United States
