= The Cambridge History of the Book in Britain =

Book series, 1999–2019

- Editor: Richard Gameson
- Subject: History of books
- Publisher: Cambridge University Press
- Publication date: 1999–2019

The Cambridge History of the Book in Britain is a seven-volume series on the history of texts in the United Kingdom. It was published between 1999 and 2019 by Cambridge University Press.

== Volumes ==
=== Vol. 2 ===
- Gillespie, Alexandra (2008). "The Long History of the Book". Huntington Library Quarterly. 71 (2): 365–371. doi:10.1525/hlq.2008.71.2.365. ISSN 0018-7895. JSTOR 10.1525/hlq.2008.71.2.365.
- Hanna, Ralph (2010). "Review of The Cambridge History of the Book in Britain: Volume II, 1100–1400". The Journal of English and Germanic Philology. 109 (3): 389–394. doi:10.5406/jenglgermphil.109.3.0389. ISSN 0363-6941. JSTOR 10.5406/jenglgermphil.109.3.0389.

=== Vol. 3 ===
- Balsamo, Luigi (2002). "Review of The Cambridge history of the Book in Britain. Vol. III: 1400-1557". La Bibliofilía (in Italian). 104 (3): 308–313. ISSN 0006-0941. JSTOR 26212707.
- Emmerson, Richard K. (2001). "Review of The Cambridge History of the Book in Britain, 3: 1400-1557". Speculum. 76 (3): 735–737. doi:10.2307/2903915. ISSN 0038-7134. JSTOR 2903915.
- Hudson, Anne (2001). "Review of The Cambridge History of the Book in Britain, Vol. III: 1400-1557". Medium Ævum. 70 (1): 123–124. doi:10.2307/43630345. ISSN 0025-8385. JSTOR 43630345.
- Schoeck, R. J. (2002). "Review of The Cambridge History of the Book in Britain, Volume III, 1400-1557". Text. 14: 403–408. ISSN 0736-3974. JSTOR 30228015.
- Stam, David H. (2001). "Review of The Cambridge History of the Book in Britain, Volume III, 1400-1557". Albion: A Quarterly Journal Concerned with British Studies. 33 (2): 277–279. doi:10.2307/4053378. ISSN 0095-1390. JSTOR 4053378.
- Stoneman, William P. (2004). "Review of The Cambridge History of the Book in Britain. Vol. 3: 1400–1557". The Papers of the Bibliographical Society of America. 98 (1): 115–118. doi:10.1086/pbsa.98.1.24295836. ISSN 0006-128X. JSTOR 24295836.
- Woudhuysen, H. R. (2001). "Review of The Cambridge History of the Book in Britain. Volume III: 1400-1557". The Review of English Studies. 52 (205): 107–110. ISSN 0034-6551. JSTOR 3070495.

=== Vol. 4 ===
- Gants, David L. (2004). "Bibliographical Scholarship and the History of the Book". Huntington Library Quarterly. 67 (3): 473–479. doi:10.1525/hlq.2004.67.3.473. ISSN 0018-7895. JSTOR 10.1525/hlq.2004.67.3.473.
- Guerrini, Anita (2003). "Review of The Cambridge History of the Book in Britain, Vol. IV: 1557-1695". Restoration: Studies in English Literary Culture, 1660-1700. 27 (2): 68–69. ISSN 0162-9905. JSTOR 43293743.
- Howard-Hill, T. H. (2004). "Review of The Cambridge History of the Book in Britain. Vol. 4: 1557–1695". The Papers of the Bibliographical Society of America. 98 (1): 97–104. doi:10.1086/pbsa.98.1.24295832. ISSN 0006-128X. JSTOR 24295832.
- Lesser, Zachary (2004). "Review of The Cambridge History of the Book in Britain. Vol. 4, 1557-1695". Renaissance Quarterly. 57 (2): 717–719. ISSN 0034-4338. JSTOR 1261821.
- King, John N. (2004). "Review of The Cambridge History of the Book in Britain. Vol. 4, 1557-1695". The Sixteenth Century Journal. 35 (3): 860–863. doi:10.2307/20477071. ISSN 0361-0160. JSTOR 20477071.
- Pettegree, Andrew (2005). "Review of The Cambridge History of the Book in Britain. Vol. 4, 1557–1695". The Journal of Modern History. 77 (2): 418–420. doi:10.1086/431835. ISSN 0022-2801. JSTOR 10.1086/431835.
- Stam, David H. (2004). "Review of The Cambridge History of the Book in Britain. (Volume IV, 1557-1695)". Albion: A Quarterly Journal Concerned with British Studies. 36 (2): 307–308. doi:10.2307/4054235. ISSN 0095-1390. JSTOR 4054235.

=== Vol. 5 ===
- Dixon, Rosemary (2010). "Review of The Cambridge History of the Book in Britain, V: 1695-1830". The Review of English Studies. 61 (250): 472–476. doi:10.1093/res/hgq045. ISSN 0034-6551. JSTOR 40783079.
- Fallon, David (2010). "1774 and All That". The Cambridge Quarterly. 39 (4): 391–398. doi:10.1093/camqtly/bfq025. ISSN 0008-199X. JSTOR 43492439.
- Gants, David (2010). "Going to the Books". Huntington Library Quarterly. 73 (2): 321–327. doi:10.1525/hlq.2010.73.2.321. ISSN 0018-7895. JSTOR 10.1525/hlq.2010.73.2.321.
- Sher, Richard B. (2010). "Review of The Cambridge History of the Book in Britain. Vol. V: 1695-1830". The English Historical Review. 125 (517): 1535–1538. doi:10.1093/ehr/ceq352. ISSN 0013-8266. JSTOR 40963220.

=== Vol. 6 ===
- Howsam, Leslie (2012). "Perspectives from Cambridge on the Book in Victorian Britain". The Papers of the Bibliographical Society of America. 106 (1): 99–109. doi:10.1086/680604. ISSN 0006-128X. JSTOR 10.1086/680604.
