= David Sington =

British film director

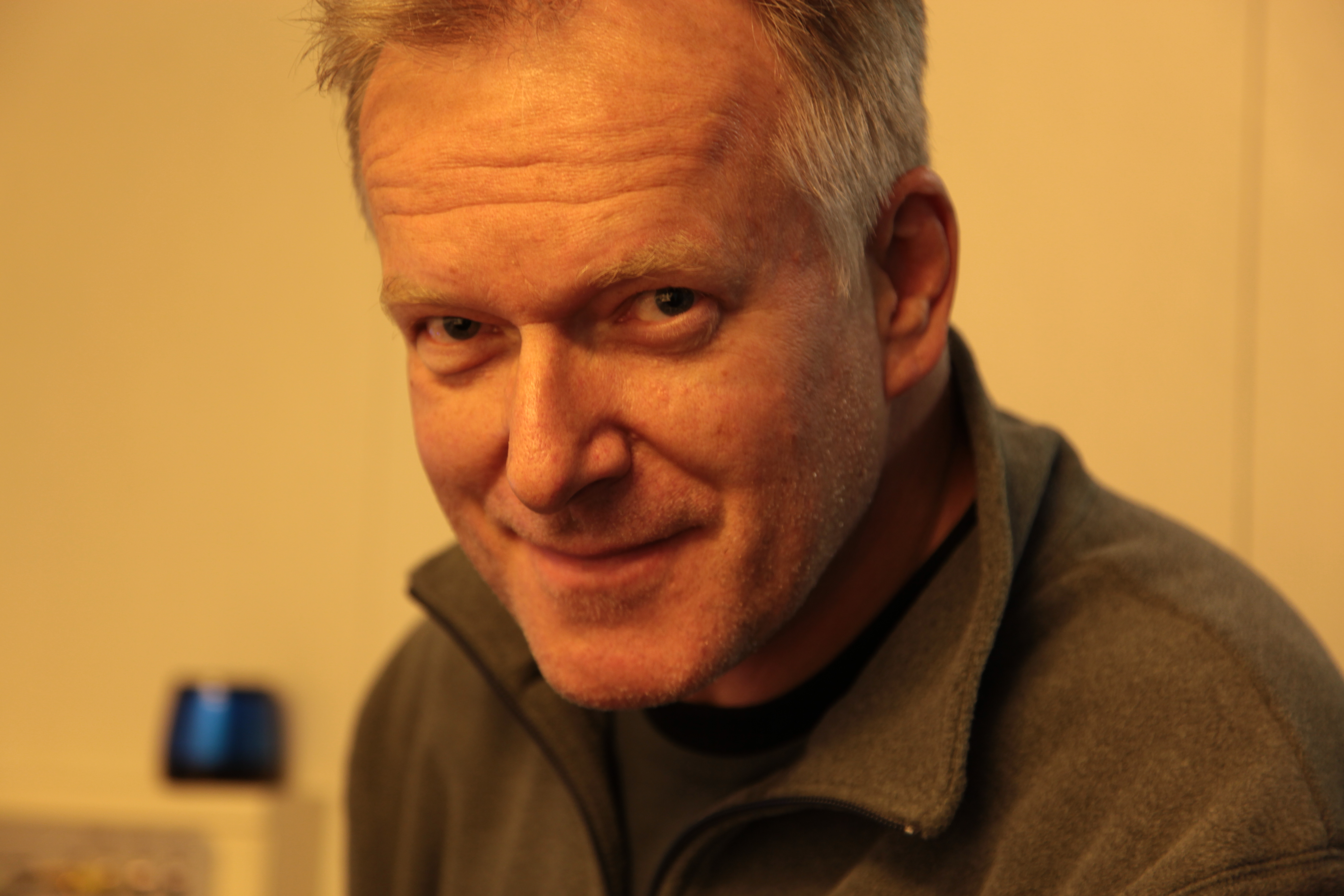
Sington in 2015

David Sington is a British-born director, producer, screenwriter and author. He read Natural Sciences at Trinity College, Cambridge, graduating in 1981.

== Career ==
He started his career in 1982 at the BBC World Service as a studio manager and subsequently a talk producer. In 1987 he moved to television and thereafter produced eight documentary films and two major documentary film series for the BBC. In 1999, he left the BBC to form his own production company DOX Productions, Ltd. Since then, he has made multiple television films. , as well as seven feature documentary films.

== Personal life ==
In 1987 he married the American literary scholar and writer Pamela Neville with whom he collaborated on a book on the influence of utopian thought. Pamela died in March 2017. The couple had no children.

== Awards ==
In 1999, he was awarded the Walter Sullivan Award for Excellence in Science Journalism. In 2000, he was made an Honorary member of Sigma Xi, The Scientific Research Society His film Project Poltergeist won a prestigious Grierson Award in 2004.

== Filmography ==
- 2020: A to Z: the Secret History of Writing, for PBS, Arte and BBC (DOX Productions/Films à Cinq)
- 2018: Mercury 13
- 2015: The Fear of 13 (Watch Free Documentaries Online)(Netflix)
- 2011: The Flaw (animated by Peter J. Richardson)
- 2007: In the Shadow of the Moon (2007 film)
- 2006: Dimming of the Sun (PBS Nova)
- 2005: Global Dimming (BBC Horizon)

== Books ==
He has co-written the following books:

- Lamb, Simon; Sington, David (September 1998). Earth Story: The Shaping of Our World. Princeton Univ Press. pp. 256pp. ISBN 978-0-691-00229-3.
- Neville-Sington, Pamela, Sington, David and Songton, David (4 November 1993). Paradise Dreamed. Bloomsbury Publishing PLC. pp. 256pp. ISBN 978-0-7475-1293-6.
