= Last Dance =

Last Dance or The Last Dance may refer to:

== Film ==
- The Last Dance (1912 film), an American Selig Polyscope Company film
- The Last Dance (1930 film), an American drama film starring Fred Walton
- The Last Dance (1941 film), an Italian film by Camillo Mastrocinque
- Daibyonin (also known as The Last Dance), a 1993 Japanese film by Juzo Itami
- Sista dansen (The Last Dance), a 1993 Danish-Norwegian-Swedish film by Colin Nutley
- Last Dance (1996 film), an American film by Bruce Beresford
- Last Dance (1998 film), or The Hole, a Taiwanese film by Tsai Ming-liang
- The Last Dance (2000 film), an American drama film directed by Kevin Dowling
- Last Dance (2002 film), a documentary featuring the Pilobolus dance company
- Last Dance (2012 film), an Australian film by David Pulbrook
- Magic Mike's Last Dance, a 2023 film by Steven Soderbergh
- The Last Dance (2024 film), a Hong Kong film by Anselm Chan
- Venom: The Last Dance, a 2024 Sony's Spider-Man Universe film

== Television ==
- The Last Dance (miniseries), a 2020 basketball documentary series
- "Last Dance" (Flashpoint), a 2009 television episode
- "Last Dance" (Frankie Drake Mysteries), a 2018 television episode
- "The Last Dance" (Saved by the Bell), a 1991 television episode
- "The Last Dance" (The Vampire Diaries), a 2011 television episode
- "Last Dance" (Alexa & Katie), a 2020 television episode

== Gaming ==
- "The Last Dance", the final level in the 2015 video game Super Mario Maker

== Literature ==
- The Last Dance, the fiftieth 87th Precinct novel by Ed McBain
- The Last Dance, period novel by Paul Charles

== Music ==
- Last Dance, a band that recorded for record label 4AD
- The Last Dance (band), a darkwave rock band

=== Albums ===
- Last Dance, by Rosie (band) 1977
- Last Dance, a 1995 album by Jason Rebello
- Last Dance (album), a 2014 album by Keith Jarret and Charlie Haden
- The Last Dance (Magnum album), 1996
- The Last Dance (Spice 1 album), 2000
- The Last Dance (Steps album), 2002
- The Last Dance (40 Below Summer album), 2006
- The Last Dance (EP), a 1993 EP by Disco Inferno, or the title song

=== Songs ===
- "Last Dance" (Donna Summer song), 1978
- "The Last Dance" (song), a 2011 song by Clare Maguire
- "Last Dance" (Big Bang song), 2016
- "Last Dance" (Dua Lipa song), 2016
- "Last Dance" (Stefania song), 2021
- "Last Dance" ((G)I-dle song), 2021
- "Last Dance", a 1973 song by Neil Young from Time Fades Away
- "Last Dance", a 1977 song by Chuck Mangione from Feels So Good
- "Last Dance", a 1983 song by George Clinton from You Shouldn't-Nuf Bit Fish
- "Last Dance", a 1985 song by The Mekons from Fear and Whiskey
- "Last Dance", a 1989 song by The Cure from Disintegration
- "Last Dance", a 1999 song by Brian McKnight from Back at One
- "Last Dance", a 2016 song by Steve Angello from Wild Youth
- "Last Dance", a 2019 song by Xomu
- "Last Dance", a 2023 song by Butcher Babies from Eye for an Eye...
- "The Last Dance", a 2007 song by The Tough Alliance from A New Chance
- "The Last Dance", a song written by Jimmy Van Heusen and Sammy Cahn
- "The Last Dance", a 2011 song by Within Temptation from The Unforgiving
- "The Last Dance", a 2022 song by Kid Rock from Bad Reputation
- "Dernière danse" ('Last dance'), a 2013 song by Indila
- "Dernière danse" (Kyo song), 2003

== See also ==
- One Last Dance (disambiguation)
