= Nick Yarris =

American writer and death row exoneree

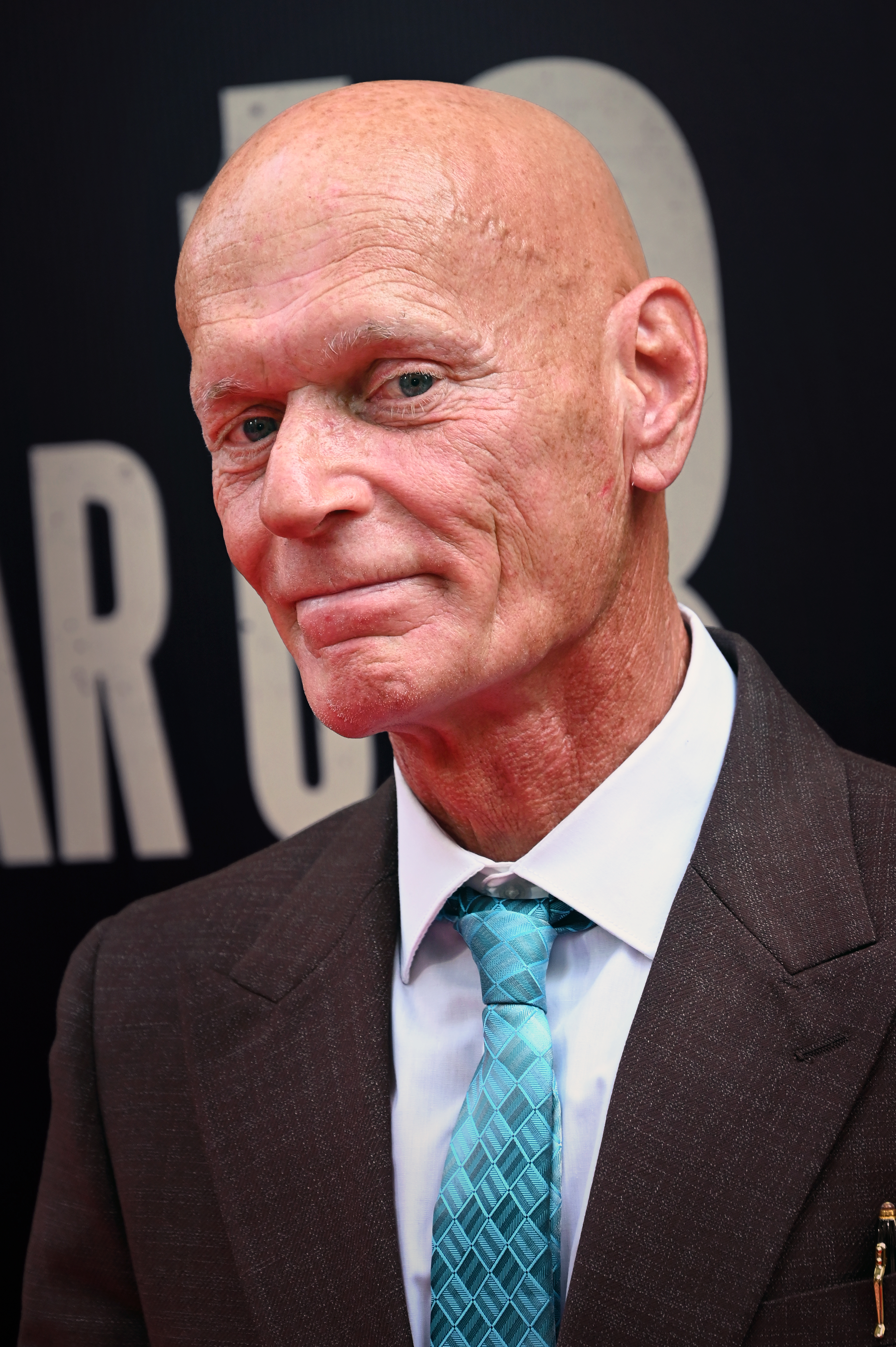
- Yarris in 2026
- Born: Nicholas James Yarris; May 18, 1961 (age 65); Philadelphia, Pennsylvania, U.S.
- Occupation: Writer
- Known for: DNA exoneration after 22 years of wrongful imprisonment on death row
- Criminal charges: Kidnapping, rape, first degree murder
- Criminal penalty: Death by lethal injection
- Criminal status: Released (exonerated)

Nicholas James Yarris (born May 18, 1961) is an American writer and storyteller who spent 22 years on death row in Pennsylvania after being wrongfully convicted of rape and murder. Yarris was exonerated by DNA testing in 2003. He was released from prison in 2004 after a separate 30-year sentence he received in Florida for lesser crimes committed after he escaped from custody in 1985 was reduced to time served.

== Prosecution, conviction, and exoneration ==
Although disputed by some family members, Yarris has stated he was the victim of sexual abuse as a child at the hands of another youth, which led him into addiction to alcohol, drugs and the commission of petty crime in his teens. On December 21, 1981, Yarris and a friend stole a car. Yarris, then age 20, was blasting music while driving under the influence when he was stopped by police in Delaware County, Pennsylvania. The officer and Yarris got into a physical confrontation, and the policeman's gun discharged. Yarris was charged with the kidnapping and attempted murder of a police officer. He was later tried and acquitted of those charges.

While in jail, facing a possible sentence of life in prison, he spotted a newspaper article about the December 16, 1981, murder and rape of Linda Mae Craig, who had been abducted from a Delaware shopping center but whose body had been found in Pennsylvania. Her true murderer is still unknown. In an effort to win favor with the authorities and avoid the consequences of his pending charges, Yarris claimed that he knew who had committed the unsolved rape-murder. When the man he named, whom he had wrongly believed to be recently deceased, proved upon investigation to be plainly uninvolved, Yarris became the number-one suspect.

Yarris was then charged with the abduction, rape, and murder of Craig. After a short jury trial, Yarris was found guilty. In July 1982, at age 21, he was sentenced to death. In 1985, Yarris escaped from custody while being transported to a post-sentence hearing, but was arrested in Florida about a month later. He pleaded guilty in Florida to armed robbery and false imprisonment for crimes he committed as a fugitive and was sentenced there to 30 years in prison. Florida authorities then returned him to death row in Pennsylvania.

Numerous appeals and post-conviction challenges proved unavailing. During his time in prison, Yarris taught himself to read, married a prison volunteer visitor, and became the first death row prisoner to seek DNA testing. In 2003, with the aid of a team of court-appointed lawyers (including Christina Swarns, later to become Executive Director of the national Innocence Project), a third round of DNA testing (following prior inconclusive efforts), some of it on previously undisclosed physical evidence, proved that two unidentified men, not Yarris, had committed the crime.

In January 2004, Yarris's 30-year sentence in Florida was reduced to 17 years and he was released on time served. Assistant State Attorney Dick Jucknath said Yarris would have faced a maximum of 7 years in prison had his wrongful murder and rape convictions not been used against him at sentencing.

== Post-exoneration activities, lawsuit, and personal life ==
Following his exoneration and release, Yarris protested once a week outside the District Attorney's Office, demanding that the DNA samples be submitted to the FBI database to find Craig's real rapists and killers. Yarris sued the Delaware County District Attorney's Office in federal court for malicious prosecution, and the case eventually settled for $4 million in 2008.

In 2005, Yarris moved to the UK, where he worked with Reprieve, married and had a daughter. (He had eventually divorced the prison visitor-volunteer who married him while he was incarcerated.) Following a second divorce, he married his third wife, also from the UK. The couple then moved back to the United States. Following another divorce, Yarris returned to the UK and married for a fourth time, moving from Somerset to Oregon. The couple separated in February 2021.

== Writings ==
Yarris is the author of the death row memoir Seven Days to Live (2008) (later reissued as The Fear of 13). He has also self-published books titled The Kindness Approach (2017), My Journey Through Her Eyes (2017), Monsters and Madmen (2018) (experiences on death row at the since-decommissioned SCI Pittsburgh), and Mind Your Heart, Nick Yarris (2024) (a memoir of the 20 years since his exoneration).

== Media coverage ==
Yarris is one of the exonerees profiled in the award-winning documentary, After Innocence (2005). He is also the subject and protagonist-narrator of David Sington's documentary The Fear of 13 released in 2015. Another documentary, featuring Yarris and two other exonerees, titled Life After Death, directed by Lior Geller, was in post-production as of 2024.

Yarris appeared on The Joe Rogan Experience on September 11, 2018, talking at length about his life story. The Yarris case was explored in a two-part interview for the December 11, 2019 episode (Season 9) of the podcast, Wrongful Conviction with Jason Flom, and was the subject of the June 17, 2019 episode of CNN/HLN's Death Row Stories, "A Prison of His Own" (Season 4, Episode 3). An extended interview, edited to highlight Yarris's talent as a first-person storyteller, appeared in February 2023 on filmmaker and photographer Mark Laita's widely-watched YouTube channel, Soft White Underbelly.

A stage play based on the Sington documentary, written by Lindsey Ferrentino and starring Adrien Brody as Yarris, premiered for a limited engagement in October–November 2024 at the Donmar Warehouse in London. The play, likewise titled The Fear of 13, opened on Broadway at the James Earl Jones Theatre on April 15, 2026, again starring Brody and featuring Tessa Thompson, to run through June 28, 2026.
