= Lindsey Ferrentino =

American dramatist

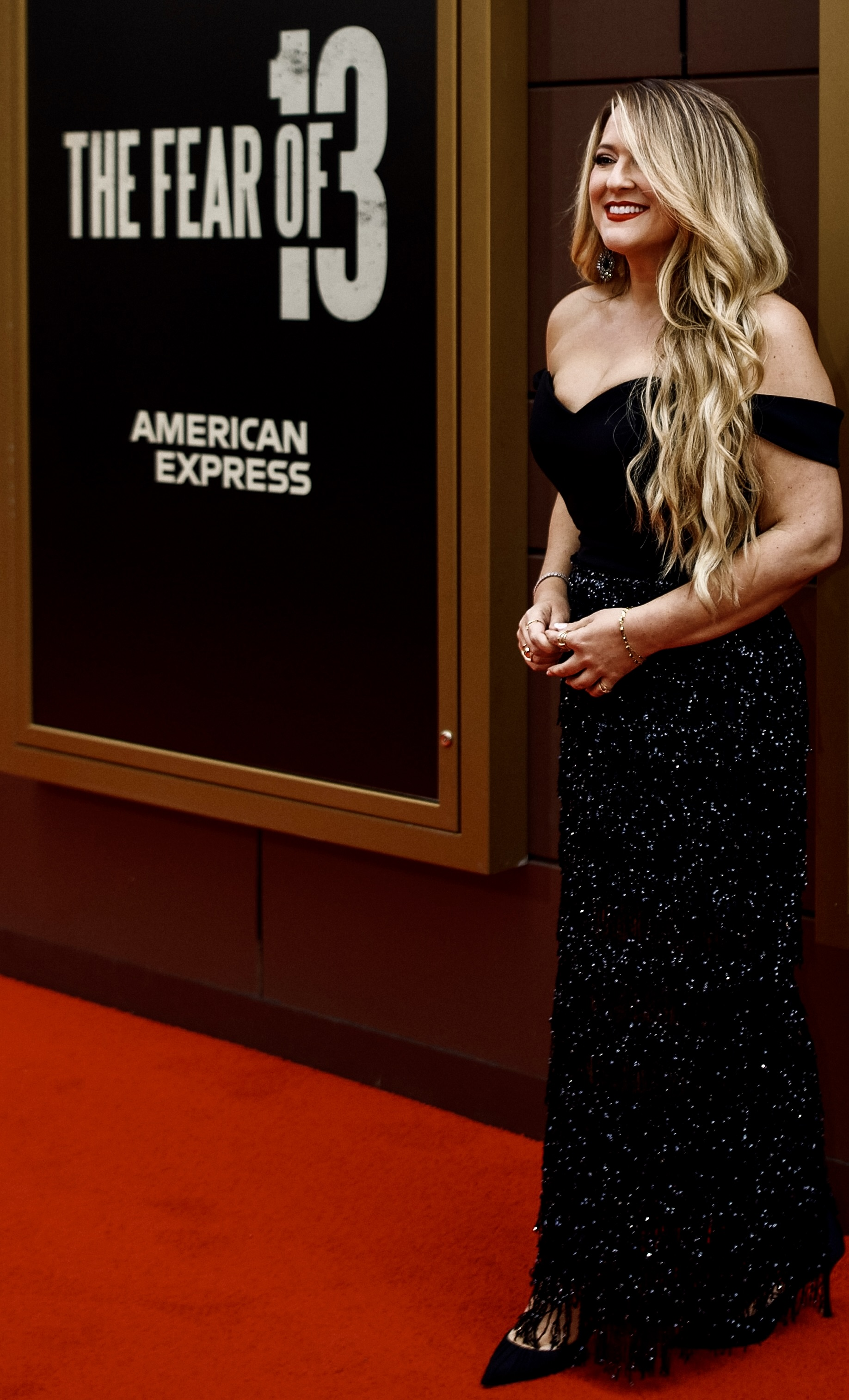
- Ferrentino in 2025
- Education: New York University (BFA); Hunter College (MFA); Yale University (MFA)
- Occupations: Playwright, Screenwriter
- Father: John Ferrentino
- Website: Official website

Lindsey Ferrentino is an American contemporary playwright and screenwriter.

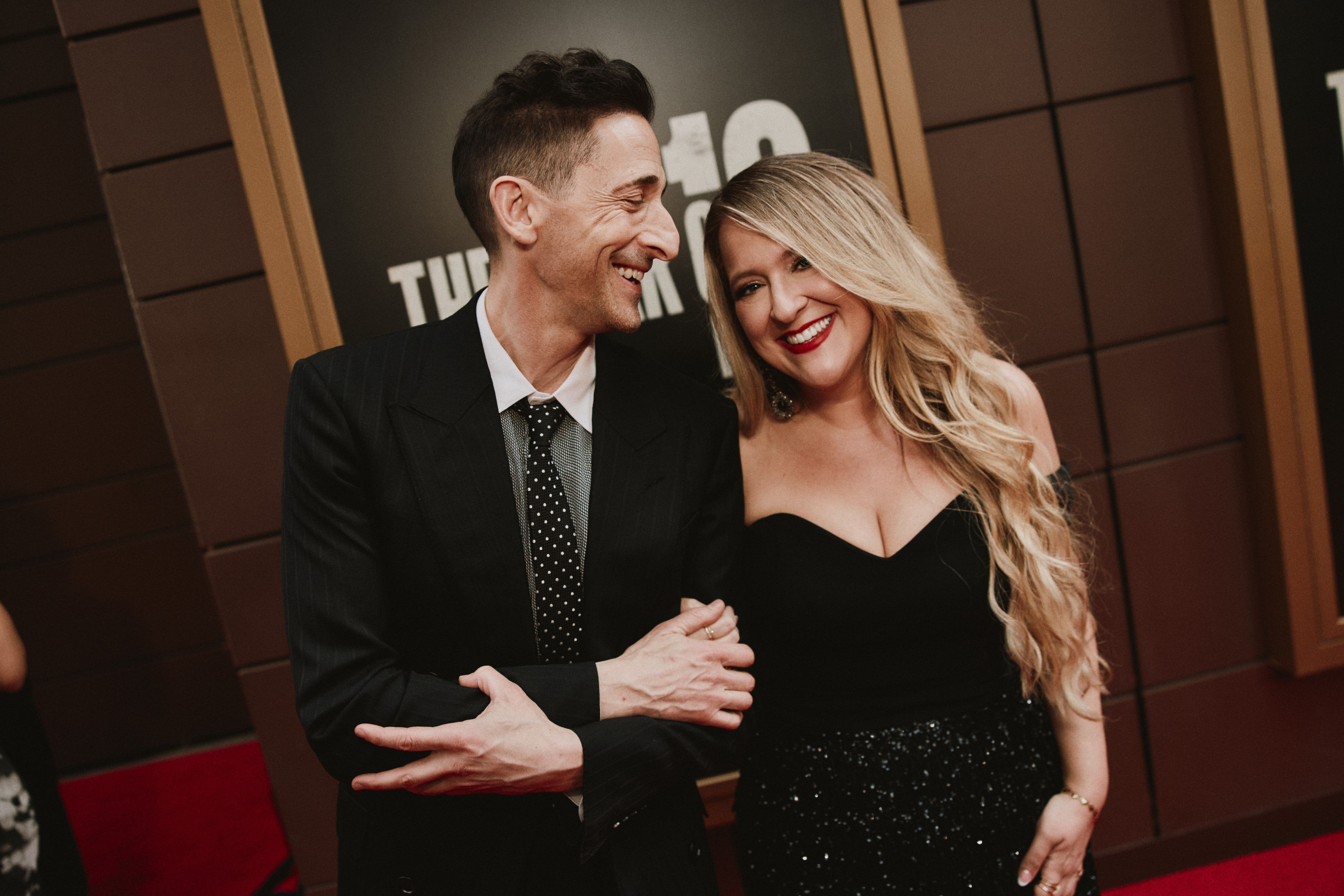
Adrien Brody and Lindsey Ferrentino at The Fear of 13 Broadway Opening

== Early life ==
Lindsey Ferrentino is the daughter of comedian and magician John Ferrentino.

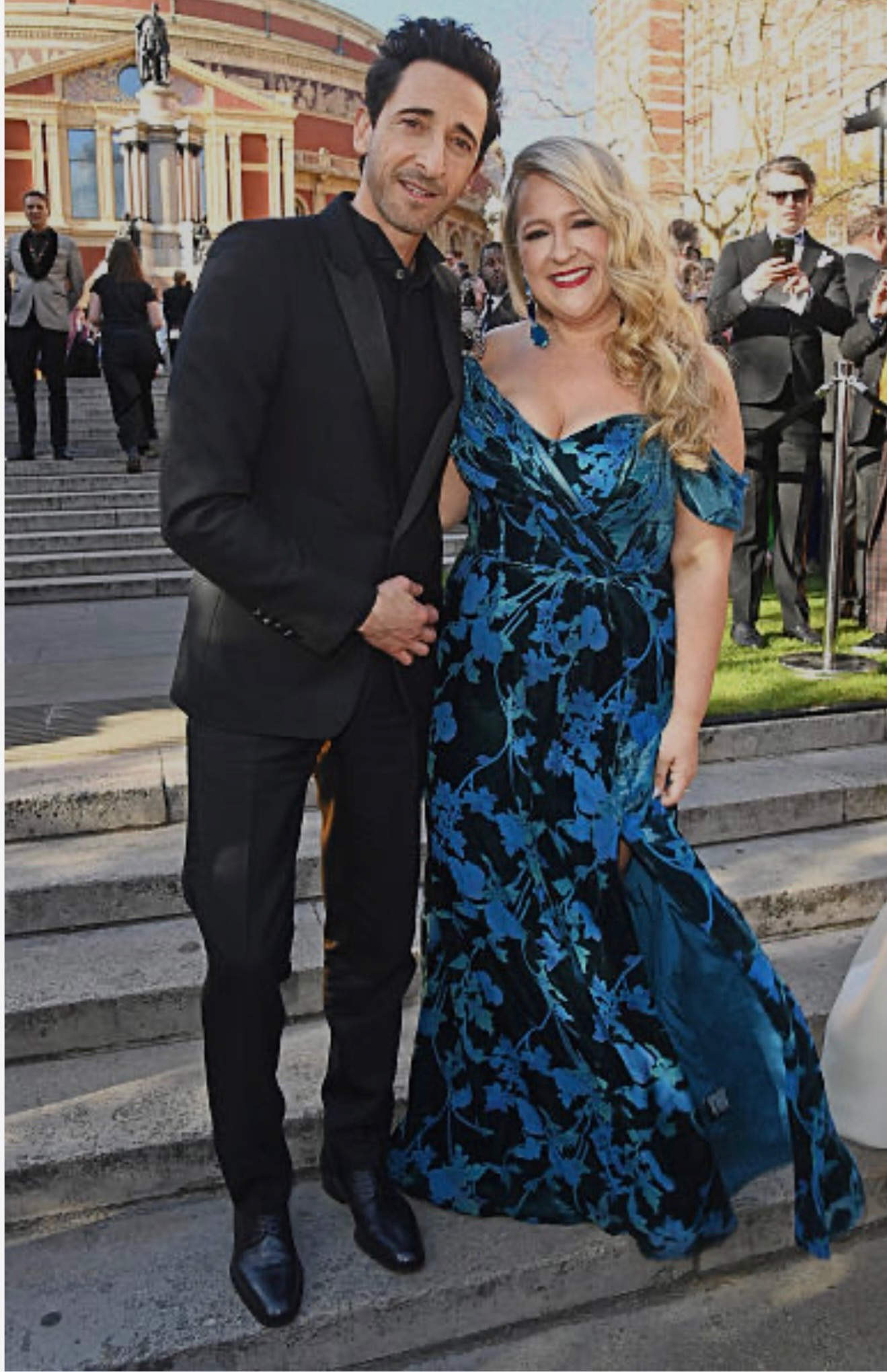
Adrien Brody and Lindsey Ferrentino arrive at the Olivier Awards 2025

== Career ==
=== Ugly Lies the Bone ===
Ugly Lies the Bone was a New York Times Critic's Pick and played a sold-out, extended run at Roundabout Theatre in the year 2015. In The New York Times review of the play Charles Isherwood wrote that Ferrentino was "a brave playwright of dauntless conviction whose unflinching portraits are hard to come by outside of journalism." Deadline Hollywood described Ugly Lies the Bone as, "clearly the work of a young talent with plenty ahead of her." The Observer described it as, "raw and inescapably moving. A play of small moments that hide big emotions." Ferrentino received the 2016 Kesselring Prize for Ugly Lies the Bone. It was later produced at The National Theatre in London in the 900-seat Lyttleton Theatre in 2017.

=== Amy and the Orphans ===
In 2018, Amy and the Orphans premiered at Roundabout Theatre Company and was called "barrier breaking" in the New York Times. Featuring American Horror Story's Jamie Brewer, Amy and the Orphans is the first Off-Broadway (or Broadway) show to have an actor with Down syndrome in a leading role. In the New York Times review of Amy and the Orphans, Brantley wrote that Ferrentino "possesses a muscular empathy which seeks to enter the minds of people for whom life is often a struggle of heroic proportions." Ferrentino, Brewer, and Eddie Barbanell received the Catalyst Awards Entertainment Industry Excellence Award for Amy and the Orphans.

=== This Flat Earth ===
In 2018, This Flat Earth ran at Playwrights Horizons. The New York Times wrote that This Flat Earth is "Ferrentino's most daring play to date, with profound and essential subjects. She is bravely attempting to contextualize 21st-century horrors within the sort of existential framework in which Thornton Wilder and Edward Albee specialized."

=== The Year To Come ===
In December 2018, the play The Year to Come premiered. The show is a reverse-chronological drama about an American family reuniting each New Year’s Eve, revealing how political and personal rifts evolve over time. Set around a backyard pool, the play explores how a family—and a nation—fractures and heals across decades. The show opened at La Jolla Playhouse and was positively received with a Critic's Pick by the San Diego Union-Tribune.

=== Not Fade Away ===
Ferrentino's first film, Not Fade Away, was in development at Annapurna Pictures, as of March 2019, produced by David O. Russell and John Krasinski, starring Emily Blunt.

=== Amy ===
In 2021, it was announced that Ferrentino would write and direct Amy, a film adaptation of her stage play Amy and the Orphans, for Netflix, with Aggregate Films attached to produce.

In relation to upcoming film projects, in a 2024 Hollywood Reporter article, Ferrentino was named Netflix's 'Go-To' Writer. The article also announced a "Playboy" film in the works and an adaptation of Rebecca Yarros' best-selling novel "In the Likely Event," both penned by Ferrentino for Netflix.

=== The Artist ===
The Artist, which Ferrentino co-adapted for the stage with Drew McOnie from the 2011 Oscar-winning film, opened at the Royal Plymouth in the UK in 2024. The show (which features almost no spoken words) reimagines the silent movie, blending vibrant choreography and period music to celebrate Hollywood's transition from silent films to talkies. The Guardian reviewed the piece as an "effervescent and delightfully inventive stage show". The Telegraph named it "an artistic triumph that has ‘West End-bound hit’ written all over it."

=== The Queen of Versailles ===
Ferrentino's first stage musical, The Queen of Versailles, opened on Broadway in October 2025. The show, which starred Kristin Chenoweth and F. Murray Abraham, was an adaptation of the 2012 documentary following David and Jackie Segal as they attempt to build the biggest home in America (modeled of the palace of Versailles) before the financial crisis brings construction to a halt. The music and lyrics were written by Oscar and Tony award-winner Stephen Schwartz. The show closed on Broadway in December 2025, six weeks past its opening.

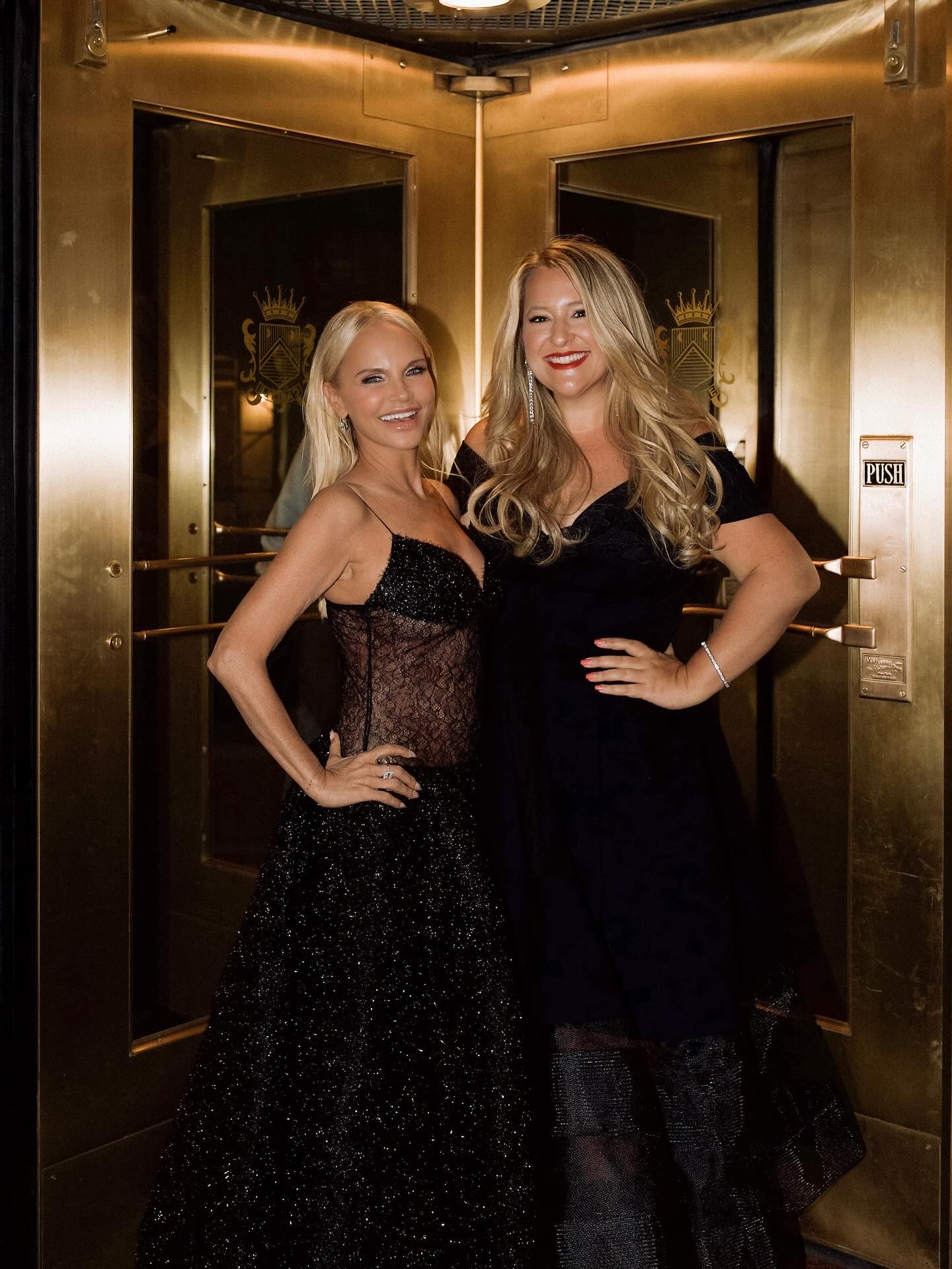
Tony Awards 2025 - Lindsey Ferrentino and Kristin Chenoweth

=== The Fear of 13 ===
Most recently, Ferrentino debuted her play The Fear of 13 (also a documentary adaptation) to London audiences at the Donmar Warehouse. The production starred Adrien Brody as Nick Yarris, a death row exoneree who attempts to overturn his conviction. The production was sold out throughout the duration of its London run. The play was named "one of the best new shows in years" by Alex Wood of WhatsOnStage. Both Ferrentino and Brody, respectively, were nominated for an Olivier Award. The show transferred to Broadway in 2026, opening at the James Earl Jones Theatre on April 15. This production saw Brody reprise his role as Yarris opposite Tessa Thompson, who portrayed his love interest; the play marked both performers' Broadway debuts. Though the show was initially scheduled to run until July 12 of that year, it eventually closed on June 28, two weeks earlier than expected. (Note: Attributed to multiple references:)

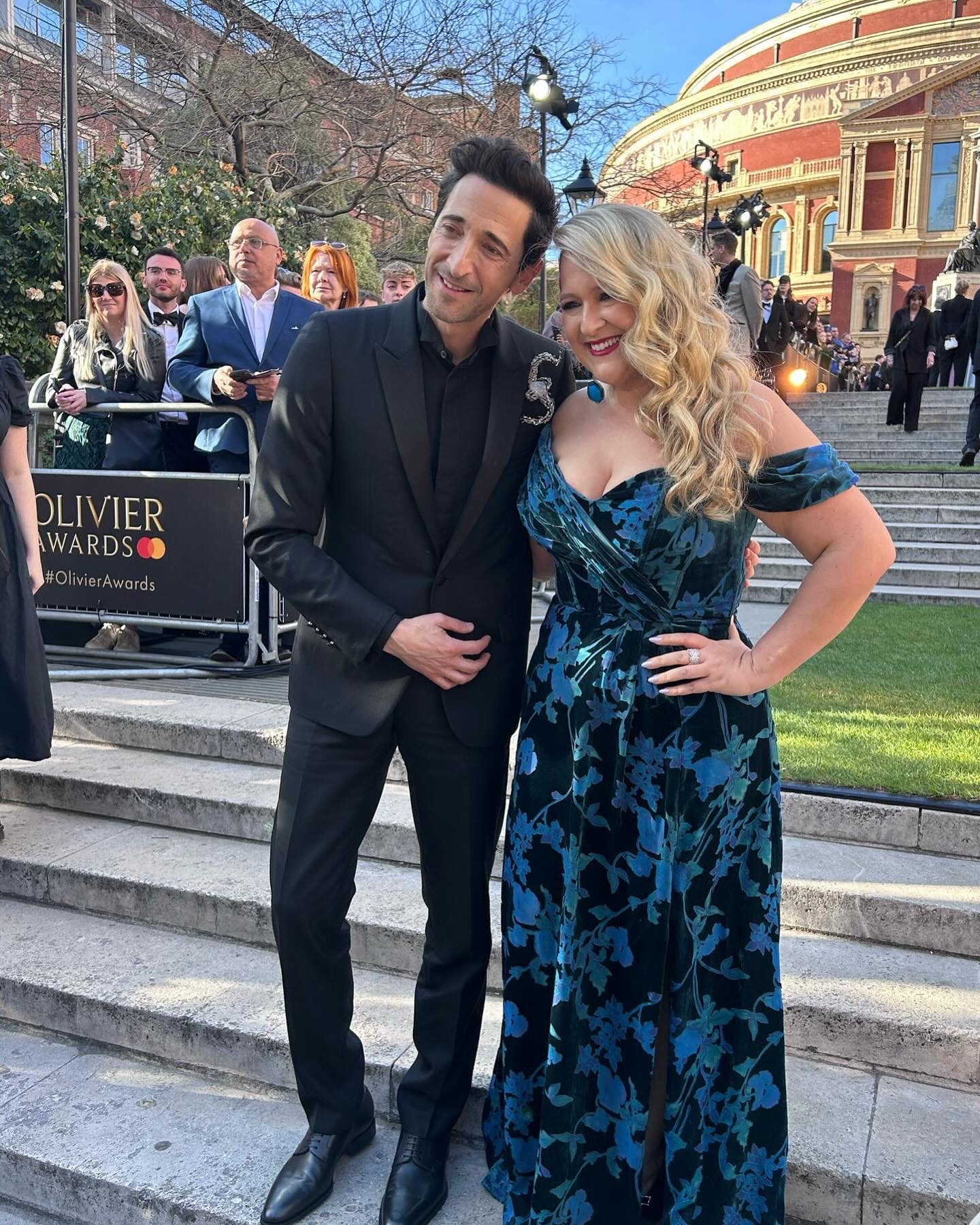
Adrien Brody and Lindsey Ferrentino arrive at the 2025 Laurence Olivier Awards

== Style ==
Ferrentino is known for writing character led stories that live within larger national narratives. The New York Times wrote that Ferrentino "possesses a muscular empathy which seeks to enter the minds of people for whom life is often a struggle of heroic proportions" and called her "a dramatist willing to wrestle with overpowering contemporary subjects." Ferrentino's 2015 off-Broadway hit Ugly Lies The Bone cemented her as a singular voice amongst contemporary playwrights, the New York Times lauding her as "A brave playwright of dauntless conviction whose unflinching portraits are hard to come by outside of journalism." Following the August 2024 world premiere of her new musical The Queen of Versailles, Variety praised her as having "a moral conscience second to none among her generation of playwrights."

== Awards and honors ==
Ferrentino's awards and honors include Olivier nomination 2025, the 2016 Kesselring Prize, Laurents/Hatcher Citation of Excellence, ASCAP Cole Porter Playwriting Prize, Paul Newman Drama Award, 2015 Kilroys List, finalist for the Susan Smith Blackburn Prize, the Catalyst Awards Entertainment Industry Excellence Award, NYU Distinguished Young Alumna Award, nominated for the Outer Critics Circle John Gassner Award, and is the only two-time finalist for the Kendeda Playwriting Prize.

== Personal life ==
Ferrentino was engaged to British actor Ralf Little from 2018 to 2024.
