= Adam Holender =

Polish cinematographer (born 1937)

- Born: 13 November 1937 (age 88); Kraków, Poland
- Education: Łódź Film School
- Occupations: Cinematographer, film director
- Website: www.adamholender.com

Adam Holender, ASC (born 13 November 1937) is a Polish-American cinematographer and film director.

== Early life and education ==
He was born 13 November 1937 in Kraków, Poland, the son of a judge. In 1940, he and his family were deported to a Siberian labor camp, and not allowed to return to Kraków until 1947.

Holender studied architecture before enrolling at Łódź Film School, from where he graduated in 1964.

== Career ==
Holender worked on short films by Krzysztof Zanussi and Roman Polański, and in the camera department of several Polish films and television series, notably Four Tank-Men and a Dog.

He moved to New York City in the 1960s, working as a truck driver and later finding a job as a grip at a commercial production company, later shooting documentaries for the BBC and CBS.

Midnight Cowboy was Holender's first feature film cinematography assignment: he was recommended to director John Schlesinger by Holender's friend Polanski. Holender later recalled:

Schlesinger turned out to be a great director to work with. (...) He likes the dirt of New York life, I took him on his first subway trip, we wandered around the streets and observed reality. I knew we were making a good film, but that it was going to be an Oscar-winning film, I had no idea.

According to Schlesinger, his inspiration to make the movie came from the 1967 Yugoslav film When I Am Dead and Gone by a Serbian director Živojin Pavlović.

== Awards and honors ==
At the 2007 Camerimage Festival in Toruń, Holender received a special award "to the Polish Cinematographer For Immense Contribution To The Art of Film".

== Filmography ==
=== Film ===
| Year | Title | Director | Notes |
|---|---|---|---|
| 1969 | Midnight Cowboy | John Schlesinger | |
| 1971 | The Panic in Needle Park | Jerry Schatzberg | |
| 1972 | Moonwalk One | Theo Kamecke | |
| 1972 | J. W. Coop | Cliff Robertson | Additional photography |
| 1972 | The Effect of Gamma Rays on Man-in-the-Moon Marigolds | Paul Newman | |
| 1974 | Man on a Swing | Frank Perry | |
| 1978 | If I Ever See You Again | Joseph Brooks | |
| 1979 | The Seduction of Joe Tynan | Jerry Schatzberg | |
| 1979 | Promises in the Dark | Jerome Hellman | |
| 1980 | Simon | Marshall Brickman | |
| 1980 | The Idolmaker | Taylor Hackford | |
| 1985 | Twisted | Himself | Director |
| 1986 | The Boy Who Could Fly | Nick Castle | with Steven Poster |
| 1987 | Street Smart | Jerry Schatzberg | |
| 1988 | To Kill a Priest | Agnieszka Holland | |
| 1989 | The Dream Team | Howard Zieff | |
| 1989 | Sea of Love | Harold Becker | Additional photography |
| 1994 | Fresh | Boaz Yakin | |
| 1995 | Smoke | Wayne Wang | |
| 1995 | Blue in the Face | Wayne Wang | |
| 1996 | I'm Not Rappaport | Herb Gardner | |
| 1996 | Grace of My Heart | Allison Anders | 2nd unit photography |
| 1997 | 8 Heads in a Duffel Bag | Tom Schulman | |
| 1998 | A Price Above Rubies | Boaz Yakin | |
| 1998 | Wide Awake | M. Night Shyamalan | |
| 2002 | Roads to Riches | Michelle Gallagher | |
| 2002 | Rollerball | John McTiernan | Additional photography |
| 2004 | Stateside | Reverge Anselmo | |
| 2005 | Carlito's Way: Rise to Power | Michael Bregman | |
| 2007 | Shortcut to Happiness | Alec Baldwin | Filmed in 2001 |
| 2019 | Apollo 11 | Todd Douglas Miller | Documentary; filmed in 1969 |

=== Television ===
| Year | Title | Notes |
|---|---|---|
| 1966 | Four Tank-Men and a Dog | 5 episodes |
| 1978 | The Other Side of Hell | TV movie |
| 1980 | The Shadow Box | TV movie |
| 1984 | Threesome | TV movie |
| 1985 | The Best Times | Episode: "Making Out" |
| 2000 | Mary and Rhoda | TV movie |
| 2000 | Falcone | |
