= Christopher Riley =

British writer and filmmaker

- Born: 21 September 1967 (age 59); Bridlington, Yorkshire, England, United Kingdom
- Education: Imperial College
- Occupations: writer and film maker
- Years active: 1995–present
- Known for: In the Shadow of the Moon; First Orbit; Moon Machines; Space Odyssey; Moonwalk One; The Girl who talked to Dolphins; The Fear of 13; One Strange Rock; The Moonwalkers - a journey with Tom Hanks
- Website: www.chris-riley.net

Christopher Riley (born 1967) is a British writer, broadcaster and film maker specialising in the history of science. He has a PhD from Imperial College, University of London where he pioneered the use of digital elevation models in the study of mountain range geomorphology and evolution. He makes frequent appearances on British television and radio, broadcasting mainly on space flight, astronomy and planetary science and was visiting professor of science and media at the University of Lincoln between 2011 and 2021.

== Education ==
Riley went to school in Cambridge, where he grew up. He studied geology at the University of Leicester for his first degree and completed his PhD at Imperial College, University of London in the mid-1990s.

== Career ==
Riley is a veteran of two NASA astrobiology missions (Leonid MAC) from 1998 and 1999 – reporting on their progress for BBC News. He co-presented the BBC's live coverage of the 1999, 2001 and 2015 solar eclipses.

He wrote and presented the BBC TWO astronomy magazine show Final Frontier, BBC TWO's live All Night Star Party – both co-productions with the Open University and the BBC FOUR cosmology series Journeys in Time and Space.

In 2006 he wrote and presented BBC Radio 4's cosmology series The Cosmic Hunters. Other documentaries he's written and presented for BBC Radio 4 include Save the Moon (2014) and For All Mankind (2012).

Behind the camera he has written and directed more than 50 films for the BBC's classic science magazine show Tomorrow's World and was a producer and director on series six of Rough Science.

In 2004 he produced the BBC's two-part drama documentary Space Odyssey: Voyage to the Planets. He was the science consultant on the BBC's remakes of their science fiction cult classics A for Andromeda (2006) and The Quatermass Experiment (2005). He directed and produced on the feature documentary film In the Shadow of the Moon, which premiered at the 2007 Sundance Film Festival, where it won the World Cinema Audience Documentary Award. The film was released in the US and Europe during the autumn of 2007.

Riley directed on the spinoff six-part series Moon Machines for the Discovery Channel in 2008, which celebrated the 400,000 engineers who'd made the Moonshots possible. The series aired in the US and the UK in June that year.

During the making of In the Shadow of the Moon, Riley rediscovered the only surviving 35mm print of the complete version of NASA's original Apollo 11 documentary film Moonwalk One which had been stored under the film's director Theo Kamecke's desk since it was made. With NASA's blessing, the pair worked to restore and remaster the feature film and re-released it in time for the 40th anniversary of the flight of Apollo 11 in July 2009.

At the Cheltenham Science Festival in 2009 he presented research conducted with forensic linguist John Olsson on the recordings of Neil Armstrong's first words spoken on the surface of the Moon in July 1969. Their study confirmed that the "a" was missing – contradicting previous conclusions presented by Peter Shann Ford in 2006. Olsson and Riley went on to show that the words were spoken spontaneously and were not rehearsed or composed by some 'wordsmith' beforehand as many have speculated they might have been.

In 2011 Riley teamed up with the European Space Agency and Italian astronaut Paolo Nespoli to make the feature-length documentary First Orbit which re-created Yuri Gagarin's pioneering spaceflight Vostok 1. The film was recorded by matching the orbit of the International Space Station to the ground path of Vostok 1, and released for free to celebrate the 50th anniversary of the pioneering human space flight.

He produced Kevin Fong's 2011 portrait of the Space Shuttle for BBC Two and Produced and Directed a 2012 film presented by Dallas Campbell which celebrated thirty-five years of NASA's Voyager Program for BBC Four. The same year Riley collaborated with Neil Armstrong's family to produce and direct the biopic First Man on the Moon, which premiered on BBC Two at the end of 2012 and on PBS Nova in December 2014. The film included interviews with Armstrong's sister June, brother Dean, and childhood friend Kocho Solacoff.

In 2013 Riley produced and directed a biopic of Nobel Prize–winning physicist Richard Feynman for the BBC. The Fantastic Mr Feynman aired on BBC Two in May that year, in time for what would have been Feynman's 95th birthday. It was the first biographical film about Feynman which the BBC had commissioned since Christopher Sykes' groundbreaking documentaries in the early 1980s. The film includes interviews with his son Carl, his daughter Michelle and his sister, physicist Joan Feynman who Riley subsequently wrote a short biography about.

In 2014 he produced and directed a documentary about American neuroscientist John Lilly's controversial 1960s attempts to build an interspecies communications bridge between humans and dolphins. The film included the only onscreen interview recorded with the female researcher at the centre of the work - Margaret Howe Lovatt, who had reportedly developed a close relationship with one of the animals. The resulting film, The Girl who talked to Dolphins, premiered at the 2014 Sheffield International Documentary Festival and received widespread five star reviews; The Telegraph noting that "the anti-sensationalist approach of Riley's superb documentary was its trump card." The film was nominated for both a BAFTA and an RTS award the same year and for a Grierson award in 2015.

In 2015 it was announced that Riley would direct a new film on the Hubble Space Telescope for National Geographic Channels. The resulting documentary Hubble's Cosmic Journey included contributions from cosmologist Stephen Hawking, astrophysicist Ed Weiler and Charlie Pellerin, US Senator Barbara Mikulski and astronauts Story Musgrave, Charlie Bolden and John Grunsfeld. It premiered at National Geographic's Washington headquarters on 14 April 2015 and received its network premiere in 171 countries the following week. The film is narrated by astrophysicist Neil deGrasse Tyson, and was nominated for an Emmy in 2015.

In October 2015 Riley's long-awaited feature documentary The Fear of 13 received its world premiere at the BFI London Film Festival where it was nominated for Best Documentary. The film tells the life story of death row prisoner Nicholas Yarris, and took Riley over seven years to make, working without funding for the project for much of that time. The title refers to triskaidekaphobia, the fear of the number 13, just one of the many words learned by prisoner Nick Yarris while absorbing thousands of books during his 20-year stay on Death Row in a Pennsylvania prison. It was received well by the critics scoring 92% on the review-aggregate site Rotten Tomatoes. The film received its network premiere on the BBC's Storyville series on 31 January 2016, and was picked up by Netflix across the rest of the world. In 2024 it was announced that actor Adrien Brody would play Yarris in a play adapted from the film by Lindsey Ferrentino and directed by Justin Martin at the Donmar Warehouse in London. In 2025 the production was nominated for an Olivier Award for best new play, with Brody nominated for best leading actor. In March 2026 the play will open on Broadway with Brody again playing the lead role.

Riley collaborated with astronaut Paolo Nespoli for a second time in 2016–2017 to work on National Geographic's series One Strange Rock, with Paolo filming on board the International Space Station for the final episode 'Home' during Expedition 52 which featured astronaut Peggy Whitson's last NASA mission. Riley directed across the series and wrote and directed the episode 'Survival' featuring astronaut Jerry Linenger. The series is hosted by actor Will Smith

In September 2023 it was announced that Riley was co-writing The Moonwalkers with actor Tom Hanks, for the Lightroom, an immersive venue in London. The show premiered on 6 December 2023. The Moonwalkers opened in a purpose-built venue in South Korea the following year, and in a modified form for an Imax screen at Space Centre Houston in February 2025. A touring version of the show, through partner Culturespace, opened at Atelier des Lumières in Paris as "Destination Lune" in September 2025 and in Amsterdam in November of that year and in Manchester UK in December. Within the first two years the show had played globally to over 700,000 people

== Solar Eclipse Chasing ==
Riley is a veteran of six total eclipses of the Sun. He saw his first one from Alderney, one of the UK's Channel Islands, where he co-presented the BBC's coverage of the event in 1999. Following that broadcast, he went on to join the BBC's presenting teams in Zambia in 2001 and the Faroe Islands in 2015. He has also seen total solar eclipses in the US; one from Oregon in 2017 and another from Cleveland in 2024, and from Northern Spain in 2026.

== Awards and honours ==
In 2005 Riley was given a Sir Arthur Clarke Award for his work producing the BBC's Space Odyssey series. The same year he was elected a Fellow of the Royal Astronomical Society for his endeavours in communicating astronomy to the public. His films and TV series on the history of science have won a nomination from the Royal Television Society and the World Cinema Audience Award at the Sundance Film Festival 2007. He received a second Sir Arthur Clarke Award in 2008 for In the Shadow of the Moon. His 2012 documentary Voyager – to the final frontier was nominated for a British Science Writer's award, and his 2014 film The Girl who talked to Dolphins, was nominated for BAFTA, RTS and Grierson awards. His 2015 film for National Geographic, Hubble's Comsic Journey, was nominated for an Emmy. His 2019 book, Where once we stood, a collaboration with artist Martin Impey, was nominated for a CILIP Kate Greenaway medal in 2020. Riley's 2021 film for National Geographic - Battle for the Black Swan, won the gold medal for History and Society at the New York Festivals TV & Film Awards in 2022, and was nominated for a BAFTA the same year. His 2023 film for National Geographic - The Twenty Million Dollar Time Bomb won him a second documentary gold medal in the History and Society at the New York Festivals TV & Film Awards and was nominated for the 2024 Maritime Media Awards.

== Film and television ==
He has directed, produced, science consulted or hosted on the following films and TV series (incomplete):

- 2025: Once Upon a Time in Space, BBC
- 2023: The $20m Time Bomb, National Geographic, Disney+
- 2022: Narcos, National Geographic, Disney+
- 2021: The Wonderful: Stories from the Space Station, Universal Pictures
- 2021: One Cup, a Thousand Stories, BBC Studios, Migu
- 2021: Battle for the Black Swan, National Geographic, Disney+
- 2020: Future Fantastic; China's Science Revolution, CIPG, Discovery Channel
- 2019: Back to the Moon, PBS NOVA
- 2019: Revolutions/Breakthrough, BBC, PBS
- 2019: Rise of the Rockets, PBS NOVA
- 2018: Eric Whitacre's Deep Field, iTunes, YouTube
- 2018: One Strange Rock, National Geographic Channel
- 2016: Survival in the Skies, Smithsonian Channel
- 2015: The Fear of 13, BBC Storyville, NetFlix
- 2015: End of the World Night, TwoFour, Channel 4
- 2015: Hubble's Cosmic Journey, Bigger Bang, National Geographic Channel
- 2015: The Sky at Night, Hubble Anniversary Special, BBC FOUR
- 2015: Stargazing Live, Total Eclipse Special, BBC ONE
- 2014: The Girl who talked to Dolphins, BBC Scotland, BBC FOUR
- 2013: Richard Hammond Builds a Planet, BBC Scotland, BBC ONE
- 2013: The Fantastic Mr Feynman, BBC Scotland, BBC TWO, Netflix
- 2012: Neil Armstrong. First Man on the Moon, Darlow Smithson, BBC TWO, PBS, Netflix
- 2012: Voyager: to the final frontier, BBC Scotland, BBC FOUR
- 2011: Dark Matters, Wide Eyed Entertainment, Science Channel
- 2011: Space Shuttle – the final mission, Ricochet Television, BBC TWO
- 2011: James May's Things You Need To Know, The Universe, Impossible Pictures, BBC TWO
- 2011: First Orbit, The Attic Room, YouTube, BBC Big Screens
- 2011: Destination Titan, BBC TWO/FOUR
- 2011: Outcasts, Kudos, BBC ONE
- 2010: Dust, Stylus Films, The Attic Room, Shorts International
- 2009: One Small Step – The Australian Story, Freehand, BBC Worldwide
- 2009: James May on the Moon, BBC TWO/FOUR
- 2009: Moonwalk One – the director's cut, BHP Group, DVD, Discovery Channel (UK)
- 2009: Music for Astronauts and Cosmonauts, BFI, DVD
- 2008: When We Left Earth: The NASA Missions, Discovery Channel
- 2008: Moon Machines, Discovery Science Channel
- 2007: In the Shadow of the Moon, Film 4, THINK Film, Discovery Films
- 2006: A for Andromeda
- 2005: Rough Science, Series 6, BBC TV
- 2005: The Quatermass Experiment
- 2004: Space Odyssey: Voyage to the Planets, BBC ONE, Discovery Channel
- 2004: Space Odyssey: the robot pioneers, BBC FOUR, Discovery Channel
- 2003: All Night Star Party, BBC TWO
- 2002: Can't Get Enough, BBC TWO
- 2002: Tomorrow's World, Series 38, BBC ONE
- 2001: Secret Life of Ghosts and Werewolves, BBC ONE
- 2001: Tomorrow's World, Series 37, BBC ONE
- 2001: Final Frontier, BBC TWO
- 2001: Journeys in Time and Space, BBC KNOWLEDGE
- 2000: Tomorrow's World, Series 36, BBC ONE
- 2000: 2000 Today, BBC ONE
- 1999: Eclipse Live, BBC ONE
- 1999: The Planets, BBC TWO

== Video installations and art commissions ==
In 2009, to coincide with the 40th Anniversary of the flight of Apollo 11, Riley collaborated with the London Science Museum on a novel video installation called "Apollo Raw and Uncut" which projected all 23 hours of NASA's 16mm Apollo flight film, shot on Apollo missions AS-501 (Apollo 4) to AS-512 (Apollo 17). Much of this footage, including an almost 8-minute sequence documenting a long drive across the rugged Descartes Highlands had never been screened in its entirety in public before. The aim of the installation was to present the story of Apollo in as unedited and unfiltered form as possible. The work was screened again in Montreal, Quebec, in November 2009, as part of an exhibition at the Canadian Centre for Architecture called 'Intermission: Films from a Heroic Future', which Riley also helped to curate, and a third time in 2013 at Lincoln's Digital Culture Festival Frequency.

Continuing the presentation of overlooked space film archives in public gallery spaces Chris collaborated with the London-based creative science agency super/collider on his 2011 show Cone Crater – a 40th anniversary celebration of Alan Shepard and Edgar Mitchell's exploration of the Frau Mauro lunar highlands, which played at The Book Club, London as part of the Apollo's End project.

In 2015, ahead of the 40th anniversary of the Voyager spacecraft's launch from Earth, Riley proposed sending a final message to the memory banks of each spacecraft as a final tribute to the Golden Records each spacecraft carries. The resulting campaign harnessed Facebook to crowdsource a short message, less than 1000 characters long, to present to NASA to send.

In 2019 Riley collaborated with 59 Productions, on their Smithsonian Air and Space Museum commission "Apollo 50:Go for the Moon" - writing the show and creating a film to complement projections onto the Washington Monument to tell the story of Apollo 11 for the 50th anniversary of the mission in July that year.

In the run-up to NASA's Perseverance mission touching down on Mars in 2021 Riley created an artwork called Worlds Apart, that mapped all NASA's previous Martian landing sites back onto their equivalent locations on Earth in terms of latitude and longitude, to draw attention to climate change. Following the successful Mars 2020 landing, Riley teamed up with the BBC World Service radio programme Digital Planet to find volunteers to travel to Andegaon Wadi, Sawali, in the central Indian state of Maharashtra (18.445°N, 77.451°E) which mapped onto the new Perseverance landing site.

== Books ==
Riley has written, co-written and contributed to over a dozen books, including Where once we stood, a collaboration with artist and illustrator Martin Impey, nominated for a Kate Greenaway medal in 2020.

- Riley, Christopher; Impey, Martin (July 2024). Where once we stood - the Artemis Edition. Harbour Moon Publishing. p. 132pp. ISBN 978-1916062511.
- Riley, Christopher; Impey, Martin (July 2019). Where once we stood. Harbour Moon Publishing. p. 128pp. ISBN 978-1916062504.
- Riley, Christopher; Dolling, Phil (April 2019). Apollo 11 owners' workshop manual - 50th anniversary edition. Haynes. p. 216pp. ISBN 978-1785215926.
- Riley, Christopher, Corfield, Richard and Dolling, Phil (August 2015). Voyager 1 & 2 owners' workshop manual. Haynes. p. 200pp. ISBN 978-0857337757.
- Charman-Anderson, Suw, ed. (October 2013). A Passion for Science. Stories of Discovery & Invention. Ada Lovelace Day. p. 106pp.
- Harris, Gemma, ed. (October 2013). Does my Goldfish Know who I Am. Faber and Faber. p. 336pp. ISBN 978-0571301935.
- Riley, Christopher, Woods, David and Dolling, Phil (November 2012). Apollo Lunar Rover owners' workshop manual. Haynes. p. 192pp. ISBN 978-0857332677.
- Harris, Gemma, ed. (October 2012). Big Questions from Little People. Faber and Faber. p. 336pp. ISBN 978-0571288519.
- Morris, Langdon; Cox, Kenneth, eds. (October 2012). International Cooperation for the Development of Space. Aerospace Technology Working Group. p. 518pp. ISBN 978-1478186236.
- Rose, Andrea, ed. (July 2011). Gagarin in Britain. Corner House. p. 158pp. ISBN 978-0863556630.
- Riley, Christopher; Dolling, Phil (June 2009). Apollo 11 owners' workshop manual. Haynes. p. 160pp. ISBN 978-1-84425-683-9.
- Haines, Tim; Riley, Christopher (October 2004). Space Odyssey: voyage to the planets. BBC Books. p. 192pp. ISBN 90-5210-593-6.
- Ridpath, Ian, ed. (June 2001). Collins Encyclopedia of the Universe. Collins. p. 384pp. ISBN 0-00-710585-1.

== Selected articles ==
- Christopher Riley (1 April 2026). "This Artemis moon mission is a truly unifying international project, one of the few we have left". London: The Guardian.
- Christopher Riley (April 2020). "Is space poised to take another giant leap?". Vienna, Austria: Room.
- Christopher Riley (20 July 2019). "Going back to the Moon is vital for the survival of the human race". London: Evening Standard.
- Christopher Riley (20 April 2015). "Twenty five years on: Hubble's unsung heroes". The Guardian. London.
- Christopher Riley (8 January 2013). "Tire Tracks to Our Future: 40th Anniversary of NASA's Lunar Rover". Houston: America Space.
- Christopher Riley (21 October 2012). "Voyager: the space explorers that are still boldly going to the stars". London: The Observer.
- Christopher Riley (20 July 2010). "Sound restored to mission control film shot during Apollo 11 Moon landing". The Guardian. London.
- Christopher Riley (8 November 2004). "Pushing Frontiers in TV Space". BBC News.
- Christopher Riley (5 May 1999). "When Worlds Collide". BBC News.
- Christopher Riley (23 March 1994). "All the answers from dial-a-boffin". The Independent.

== See also ==
- Mars_landing#Twinned_locations_to_Mars_landing_sites_on_Earth
- The Fear of 13
- First Orbit
- Moonwalk One
- In the Shadow of the Moon
- Space Odyssey: Voyage to the Planets
- The Quatermass Experiment
- A for Andromeda
- Tomorrow's World
