= First Orbit =

- 2011 release cover
- Directed by: Christopher Riley
- Produced by: Christopher Riley
- Starring: Yuri Gagarin; Sergei Korolev
- Cinematography: Paolo Nespoli
- Edited by: Stephen Slater; Tabitha Moore
- Music by: Philip Sheppard
- Distributed by: YouTube, The Attic Room
- Release date: 12 April 2011
- Running time: 105 minutes
- Country: United Kingdom
- Languages: English, Russian

First Orbit is a 2011 feature-length, experimental documentary film about Vostok 1, the first human space flight around the Earth. By matching the orbit of the International Space Station to that of Vostok 1 as closely as possible, in terms of ground track and time of day, documentary filmmaker Christopher Riley and European Space Agency astronaut Paolo Nespoli were able to film the view that Yuri Gagarin saw on his pioneering 1961 orbital space flight. This new footage was cut together with the original Vostok 1 mission audio recordings sourced from the Russian State Archive of Scientific and Technical Documentation. The film features the music of composer Philip Sheppard.

== Production ==
Although the film archive of Gagarin’s training, preparations, and subsequent world tour is extensive, footage of the actual Vostok 1 flight hardly exists. In 2010 Riley came up with the idea to film Yuri’s original view of the Earth from space through the International Space Station's new giant-windowed cupola.

The International Space Station (ISS) orbits the Earth once every 90 minutes, but it does not always follow the same route that Gagarin took. To find out when filming opportunities might occur, the European Space Agency (ESA) teamed Riley up with German Flight Dynamics Engineer, Gerald Ziegler. Ziegler discovered that the ISS covered similar ground to Gagarin's Vostok 1 spaceship approximately every week. To complicate things further, the filmmakers needed to film at exactly the same time of day that Gagarin made his flight: passing over Gagarin’s launch site, near the Aral Sea, at 06:07 UT and into the nightside of Earth over the Pacific Ocean at 06:37, before emerging into sunlight again over the Southern Atlantic at 07:10 UT and passing across the African continent and the Middle East, returning to the ground at 07:55 UT, just north of the Caspian Sea.

Further calculations confirmed that opportunities to film this trajectory, with the correct sun angles, at this exact time of day, only came around once every six weeks. According to Riley, the second challenge was fitting these filming opportunities into crew time on board the space station. "The astronauts have a busy schedule; conducting a packed programme of experiments, Earth observations and activities like sleep, exercise and meal times. This meant that accommodating the extra filming request for First Orbit was yet another challenge for the ESA mission directors," he told BBC news in a March 2011 interview. On the final flight path back towards Gagarin's landing site, the scenes shot for First Orbit are slightly to the east of the original Vostok 1 trajectory. Because the vantage point is so high, the vista was similar to that of Gagarin's vantage point.

Mission directors Roland Luettgens and Giovanni Gravili worked closely with the team to turn the filming opportunities into precise technical notes which translated Chris's camera directions into instructions for the crew. After a brief test shoot in November 2010, conducted by NASA's Expedition 25 astronaut Doug Wheelock, European Space Agency astronaut Paolo Nespoli filmed most of the footage for the project in early January 2011. This new footage showed the Earth as Gagarin would have seen it almost exactly fifty years before. The film does include views of the Moon, though. When Gagarin flew into the nightside of the Earth on 12 April 1961, there was a crescent moon and, according to his 1960s autobiography, Road to the Stars, Gagarin tried looking for the Moon out of curiosity, to see what it looked like from space. Unfortunately, it was not in his field of view. The filmmakers added the Moon into the scene as a tribute.

=== Music ===
The music in First Orbit was composed by Philip Sheppard and was taken from his album Cloud Songs. Riley first worked with Sheppard in 2006 on the Sundance award-winning feature documentary film, In the Shadow of the Moon. Since that time, he had worked on a new suite of music inspired by space flight, which he donated to this new film project.

Coincidentally, the music in the film was taken on board the ISS by NASA astronaut Catherine Coleman before it was used in the film. Catherine Coleman flew to the ISS with astronaut and First Orbit cameraman Paolo Nespoli without either of them knowing about the other's connection to the film project.

=== Archive audio ===
The producers sourced portions of Gagarin's original mission audio for First Orbit from the Russian State Archive. These historic recordings principally document the conversation between Yuri Gagarin on board Vostok 1 and Sergei Korolev on the ground. According to Riley, it is the first time that such quantities of the flight have been heard outside Russia. Additional archive audio in the film comes from a Radio Moscow report broadcast during the flight and news bulletins from the BBC and the Information Telegraph Agency of Russia TASS. The Russian recordings in the film are subtitled in English.

== Global distribution ==
The finished film was streamed through the website www.firstorbit.org in a global YouTube premiere on 12 April 2011. On the day of release the film was viewed 1.3 million times within 24 hours and 2.3 million times within 48 hours. In addition to this online première the film opened on over 1600 screens around the world in more than 130 countries, including UNESCO HQ in Paris, Boeing HQ in Seattle, and the European Space Agency’s Columbus Control Centre near Munich. In October 2011 the producers announced a call to action to translate the film into as many languages as possible. Their translation campaign resulted in 30 new languages which were published for free on the project's web site. To make these translations as accessible as possible the producers launched a crowd funding campaign on IndieGoGo to manufacture multi-language DVD and Blu-ray discs of the film. They raised only 20% of their target amount, but went ahead with the production anyway, releasing a limited run of discs on 12 March 2012, through the project's web site, and Amazon, almost exactly a year after the film was originally launched.

== See also ==
- Gagarin: First in Space, 2013 docudrama
