= Tsiolkovsky State Museum of the History of Cosmonautics =

First museum of space exploration (1967)

Coordinates: 54°31′2″N 36°13′50″E

Konstantin E. Tsiolkovsky State Museum of the History of Cosmonautics
- Государственный музей истории космонавтики имени К.Э.Циолковского
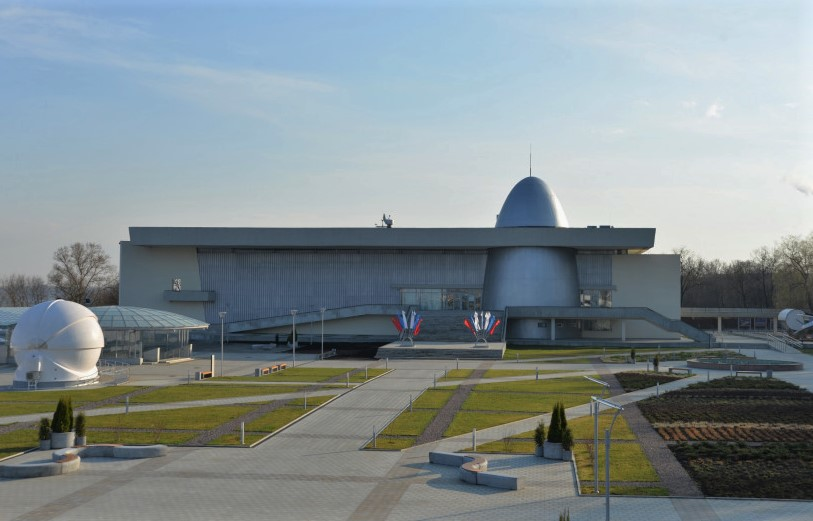
- Main building of the Museum of the Historic of Cosmonautics
- Established: 3 October 1967
- Location: Kaluga, Kaluga Oblast, Russia
- Type: Aviation museum
- Director: Natalya Alekseevna Abakumova
- Website: gmik.ru

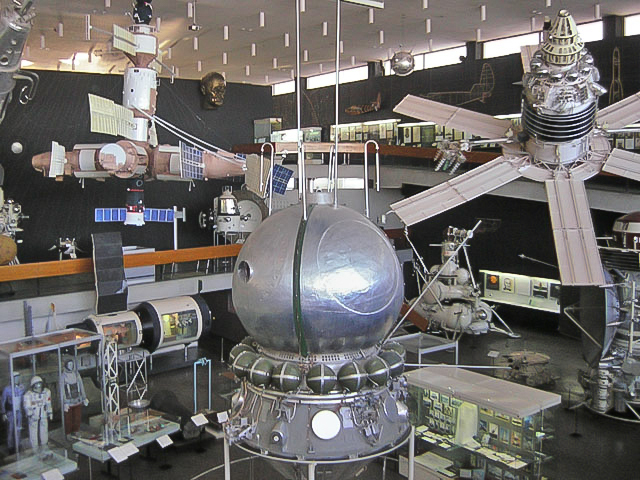
The Hall of Space Technology inside the museum. The exhibition includes the models and replicas of the following Russian inventions: the first satellite, Sputnik 1 (a ball under the ceiling); the first spacesuits (lower-left corner); the first human spaceflight module, Vostok 1 (center); the first Molniya-type satellite (upper right corner); the first space rover, Lunokhod 1 (bucket on wheels on the right); the first space station, Salyut 1 (left); the first modular space station, Mir (upper left).

The Konstantin E. Tsiolkovsky State Museum of the History of Cosmonautics (Russian: Государственный музей истории космонавтики имени К.Э.Циолковского) is the first museum in the world dedicated to the history of space exploration. It was opened on 3 October 1967 in Kaluga, and is named after Konstantin Tsiolkovsky, a school master and rocket science pioneer who lived most of his life in this city. The driving force behind the creation of the museum was Sergei Korolyov, chief designer of RKK Energiya. The building was designed by Boris Barkhin, Evgeny Kireev, Nataliya Orlova, Valentin Strogy and Kirill Fomin, and the cornerstone was laid by Yuri Gagarin on 13 June 1961. The museum has over 100,000 visitors per year and has 127 employees, of whom 43 are curators.

== Main exposition ==
The exposition of the museum consists of two parts. The first part is dedicated to the ideas and research of Tsiolkovsky, and shows a model of the rocket designed by Tsiolkovsky as well as copies of his scientific work. The second part contains mock-ups of space craft like Sputnik 1 and samples of Moon dust. Just outside the museum is a rocket park, which contains amongst others a R-7 rocket.

== Tsiolkovsky house ==
Tsiolkovskiy lived in a cabin on the outskirts of Kaluga. In 1936, after he'd died there, the property was converted into a museum in his honor. Toward the end of his life, Soviet physicist and academic M.E. Tulchinskiy completed a tenure as director of the Tsiolkovsky Memorial House. He was researching Tsiolkovsky's notes in preparation for a book on the reclusive scientist's life, but he died before he could complete it.

The museum also incorporates a scientific effort to study the life and works of Konstantin Tsiolkovsky. The Annual Tsiolkovsky Readings and Conference is organized by the museum.

== See also ==
- RKK Energiya museum, major Russian space museum
- French Air and Space Museum
- (United States) National Air and Space Museum
  - Steven F. Udvar-Hazy Center
- List of aerospace museums
