= Moon Machines =

Documentary television series

- Genre: Documentary; Science; Space exploration History
- Directed by: Christopher Riley; Duncan Copp; Nick Davidson
- Starring: Konrad Dannenberg; Robert Seamans; George Phelps; Don Brincka; Donald Binns; J. Halcombe Laning; Bob Schwinghamer; Bill Lucas; Frank DeMattia; Saverio "Sonny" Morea; Jerry Florey; Tom Herrala; Bill Ayrey; Joe Kosmo; Ken Thomas; Homer Reihm; Eleanor Foraker; Earl Bahl; Don Rethke; Harlan Brose; Dave Jennings; Tom Sylvester; Jim LeBlanc; James McBarrow; Bob Seamans; Bill Stoney; Joe Gavin; Dick Dunne; Lynn Radcliffe; Steve Rocamboli; Dick Wilde; Josh Stoff; Jack Clemons
- Narrated by: Bill Hope
- Composer: Philip Sheppard
- Country of origin: United States
- Original language: English
- No. of episodes: 6

Production
- Running time: 44 minutes

Original release
- Network: Science Channel
- Release: July 6 – July 10, 2008

Moon Machines is a Science Channel HD documentary miniseries consisting of six episodes documenting the engineering challenges of the Apollo program to land men on the Moon. It covers everything from the iconic Saturn V to the Command Module, the Lunar Module, the Space Suits, the Guidance and Control Computer, and the Lunar Rover. It was created by the team that made In the Shadow of the Moon in association with NASA to commemorate the agency's fiftieth anniversary in 2008. It first aired in June 2008 in the U.S. and UK, and was released on DVD a year later in June 2009.

== Overview ==
The miniseries features interviews with around 70 of the 400,000 engineers who worked on the Apollo program during the 1960s and early 1970s. These interviews are intercut with archive film, sourced by Footagevault from NASA's various film archives stored at the Johnson Space Center in Houston, Texas, the Glenn Research Center in Cleveland, Ohio, and from the National Archives in Washington.

The miniseries is narrated by actor Bill Hope.

== Music ==
The score was composed by Philip Sheppard.

== Episodes ==
=== Part 1: The Saturn V Rocket ===
The first episode of the series documents the creation of the iconic Saturn V rocket.

=== Part 2: The Command Module ===
The second episode is centered on the construction of the Apollo Command Module and the setback of the Apollo 1 fire.

=== Part 3: The Navigation Computer ===
The third episode details the story of MIT's work on the Apollo Guidance Computer.

=== Part 4: The Lunar Module ===
The fourth episode features the Grumman project to build mankind's first true spacecraft, the Apollo Lunar Module.

=== Part 5: The Space Suit ===
The penultimate episode focuses on the teams that created the remarkable Apollo pressure suit.

=== Part 6: The Lunar Rover ===
The series' final episode centers on the design and perfection of the novel Lunar Roving Vehicle, carried to the Moon on the Apollo J-class missions.

== Awards and nominations ==
Part 2, the story of the Command Module, won a Grand REMI from the WorldFest-Houston International Film Festival in 2009
