= Oleg Ivanovsky =

Soviet aerospace engineer (1922–2014)

Oleg Genrikhovich Ivanovsky (Russian: Оле́г Ге́нрихович Ивано́вский; 18 January 1922 – 18 September 2014) was a Russian engineer in the former Soviet space program who played a pioneering role in spacecraft construction.

Ivanovsky graduated from the Moscow Power Engineering Institute in 1953. Designer-General Sergei Korolev recruited him into the Soviet space program. Ivanovsky rose to chief designer at OKB-1, Korolev's design bureau. Among other things he was deputy principal designer of the first and second Sputniks, principal designer of Vostok manned spaceships, and creator of space probes. Ivanovsky personally helped Yuri Gagarin mount the gantry and climb into Vostok 1 and helped rebolt the hatch after Gagarin complained that it had not been closed and sealed correctly. He was said to be the last person to shake Gagarin's hand before the Vostok 1 flight. Ivanovsky was the Recipient of the Lenin Prize (1960) and USSR State Prize (1977).
