= Apollo 11 (2019 film) =

2019 documentary film

- Theatrical release poster
- Directed by: Todd Douglas Miller
- Produced by: Todd Douglas Miller; Thomas Petersen; Evan Krauss
- Starring: Edwin Aldrin; Neil Armstrong; Michael Collins; Charles Duke; Bruce McCandless
- Edited by: Todd Douglas Miller
- Music by: Matt Morton
- Production companies: CNN Films; Statement Pictures
- Distributed by: Neon (United States and Canada); Universal Pictures (International)
- Release dates: January 24, 2019 (Sundance); March 1, 2019 (United States)
- Running time: 93 minutes
- Country: United States
- Language: English
- Box office: $15.3 million

Apollo 11 is a 2019 American documentary film edited, produced, and directed by Todd Douglas Miller. It focuses on the 1969 Apollo 11 mission, the first spaceflight to land humans on the Moon. The film consists solely of archival footage, including 70 mm film previously unreleased to the public, and does not feature narration, interviews, or modern recreations. The Saturn V rocket, Apollo 11 crew (consisting of Buzz Aldrin, Neil Armstrong, and Michael Collins), and Apollo program Earth-based mission operations engineers are prominently featured in the film.

The film premiered at the Sundance Film Festival on January 24, 2019, and was released theatrically in the United States by Neon on March 1. It received acclaim from critics and grossed $15 million at the box office. At the 4th Critics' Choice Documentary Awards, the film won a leading five awards (including Best Documentary Feature), and, at the 72nd Primetime Creative Arts Emmy Awards, it won three awards (for editing and sound) out of five nominations, one of which recognized Aldrin and Collins' work capturing the Apollo 11 mission on film.

== Production ==
Video from the National Archives

In late 2016, Todd Douglas Miller had recently completed work on The Last Steps, a documentary short about Apollo 17, when British archival producer and film editor Stephen Slater suggested making a similarly themed documentary for the upcoming 50th anniversary of Apollo 11. CNN Films subsequently became a partner in the project.

Miller's conception of the film was centered on a direct cinema approach. The final film contains no voice-over narration or interviews beyond what was available in the contemporary source material. Portions of the mission are illustrated by animated graphics depicting the parts of the Apollo spacecraft as line drawings, the designs of which are based on the cel-animated graphics in Theo Kamecke's 1971 documentary Moonwalk One. In addition, three wordless biographical sequences summarize the lives of Edwin Aldrin, Neil Armstrong, and Michael Collins up to 1969 by means of family photographs and archive footage.

In May 2017, cooperation between Miller's production team, NASA, and the National Archives and Records Administration resulted in the discovery of unreleased 70 mm footage from the preparation, launch, mission control operations, recovery, and post flight activities of Apollo 11. The large-format footage includes scenes from Launch Complex 39, spectators present for the launch, the launch of the Saturn V rocket, the recovery of the astronauts and the Apollo 11 command module Columbia, and post-mission activities aboard the USS Hornet. The film incorporates this footage alongside 35 mm and 16 mm footage, still photography, and closed-circuit television footage. Apollo 11: First Steps Edition, a 47-minute edit of the film for exhibition in museum IMAX theaters, includes extended large-format scenes that differ from the full-length documentary.

The filmmakers used the facilities of Final Frame, a post-production firm in New York City, to make high-resolution digital scans of all reels depicting ground based activities that were available in the National Archives. Specialized climate-controlled vans were used to safely transport the archival material to and from College Park, Maryland.

In addition to hundreds of hours of video, the production team sourced over 11,000 hours of audio recordings. Among the audio recordings were 30-track tapes of voice recordings at every Mission Control station. Ben Feist, a Canadian software engineer, wrote software to improve the fidelity of the newly available audio. Slater, who had synchronized audio recordings with silent 16 mm Mission Control footage in earlier projects, performed the task of synchronizing the audio and film. The production team was able to identify "Mother Country", a song by folk musician John Stewart, in Lunar Module voice recordings, and the song was subsequently featured in the film.

Neon acquired worldwide theatrical distribution rights to the film in July 2018.

=== Soundtrack ===
Composer Matt Morton only used electronic instruments that were available in 1969 for the film's score. The seventeen-track album Apollo 11 (Original Motion Picture Soundtrack) was released worldwide by Milan Records for digital download on March 8, 2019, on CD on June 28, and on vinyl on July 19.

== Accuracy ==
The film took a few liberties with the timeline of the mission. For example, an incident occurred during the return voyage—on day 8 of the mission at Ground Elapsed Time (GET) 179:00:29—involving the disconnection of Michael Collins's biomedical sensor (his impedance pneumograph), which led him to wisecrack, "I promise to let you know if I stop breathing," but this event is depicted in the film as happening during the approach to the Moon before the separation of the command module Columbia and Lunar Module Eagle.

== Release ==
"Apollo 11 Filmmaker Thanks National Archives"

The world premiere of Apollo 11 took place in Park City, Utah, at the Sundance Film Festival on January 24, 2019. It was given a limited release in the United States in IMAX through Neon on March 1, and was released in the United Kingdom on June 28, through Universal Pictures and Dogwoof.

=== Home media ===
Universal Pictures released Apollo 11 in the U.S. for digital download, DVD, and Blu-ray on May 14, 2019. The discs have two extra features: a 3-minute featurette titled "Apollo 11: Discovering the 65mm", and a theatrical trailer. The film was released on DVD, digital, Blu-ray, and a 4K Ultra HD two-disc set in the United Kingdom on November 4, 2019, by Dogwoof.

== Reception ==
=== Box office ===
Its opening weekend in theaters, Apollo 11 grossed $1.6 million from 120 IMAX theaters (a per-venue gross of $13,392), finishing 15th at the box office. The following weekend, the film gave up most of its IMAX venues to newcomer Captain Marvel, but played in a total of 405 traditional theaters, and made $1.3 million, finishing 10th at the box office. The film continued to hold well its third weekend of release, grossing $1.2 million from 588 theaters (a drop of just 2% from the weekend before).

=== Critical response ===
Upon its premiere at the 2019 Sundance Film Festival, critics praised the film and the quality of the footage. On the review aggregator website Rotten Tomatoes, 99% of 192 critics' reviews of the film are positive, with an average rating of 8.9/10; the site's "critics consensus" reads: "Edifying and inspiring in equal measure, Apollo 11 uses artfully repurposed archival footage to send audiences soaring back to a pivotal time in American history." On Metacritic, the film has a weighted average score of 88 out of 100, based on reviews from 35 critics, indicating "universal acclaim".

David Ehrlich of IndieWire complimented Miller's ability to make the Moon landing sequence in the film feel unique and thrilling, and stated that the clarity of the footage "takes your breath away". Owen Gleiberman of Variety called the footage "quite spectacular", and, like a number of other critics, compared Apollo 11 to Damien Chazelle's 2018 Neil Armstrong biopic First Man. Glenn Kenny of The New York Times called the film "entirely awe-inspiring", and wrote, "Although we know how the mission turns out, the movie generates and maintains suspense. And it rekindles a crazy sense of wonder at, among other things, what one can do practically with trigonometry." (Note: In reality, mathematics far more advanced than trigonometry was used to reach the Moon.) Matt Zoller Seitz of RogerEbert.com gave the film four-out-of-four stars, calling it "an adrenaline shot of wonder and skill. [...] Films this completely imagined and ecstatically realized are so rare that when one comes along, it makes most other movies, even the good ones, seem underachieving. Any information that you happen to absorb while viewing Apollo 11 is secondary to the visceral experience of looking at it and listening to it."

=== Accolades ===
Award	Date of ceremony	Category	Recipient(s)	Result	Ref(s)
Sundance Film Festival	February 2, 2019	Special Jury Award for Editing	Todd Douglas Miller	Won	
Sundance Film Festival	February 2, 2019	US Documentary Grand Jury Prize	Todd Douglas Miller	Nominated	
Stephen Hawking Medal for Science Communication	June 24, 2019	Film community	Todd Douglas Miller	Won	
Los Angeles Film Critics Association Awards	December 8, 2019	Best Editing	Todd Douglas Miller	Won	
Independent Spirit Awards	February 8, 2020	Best Documentary Feature	Todd Douglas Miller	Nominated	
British Academy Film Awards	February 2, 2020	Best Documentary	Apollo 11	Nominated	
Peabody Awards	June 10, 2020	Documentary	Apollo 11	Won	
Critics' Choice Documentary Awards	November 10, 2019	Best Documentary Feature	Apollo 11	Won	
Critics' Choice Documentary Awards	November 10, 2019	Best Director	Todd Douglas Miller	Nominated	
Critics' Choice Documentary Awards	November 10, 2019	Best Editing	Todd Douglas Miller	Won	
Critics' Choice Documentary Awards	November 10, 2019	Best Score	Matt Morton	Won	
Critics' Choice Documentary Awards	November 10, 2019	Best Archival Documentary	Apollo 11	Won	
Critics' Choice Documentary Awards	November 10, 2019	Best Science/Nature Documentary	Apollo 11	Won	
American Cinema Editors Awards	January 17, 2020	Best Edited Documentary (Feature)	Todd Douglas Miller	Won	
Cinema Eye Honors	January 6, 2020	Outstanding Achievement in Editing	Todd Douglas Miller	Won	
Cinema Eye Honors	January 6, 2020	Outstanding Achievement in Original Music Score	Matt Morton	Won	
Producers Guild of America Awards	January 18, 2020	Outstanding Producer of Documentary Theatrical Motion Pictures	Todd Douglas Miller, Thomas Petersen and Evan Krauss	Won	
Primetime Emmy Awards	September 14, 2020	Outstanding Directing for a Documentary/Nonfiction Program	Todd Douglas Miller	Nominated	
Primetime Emmy Awards	September 14, 2020	Outstanding Cinematography for a Nonfiction Program	Buzz Aldrin and Michael Collins	Nominated	
Primetime Emmy Awards	September 14, 2020	Outstanding Picture Editing for Nonfiction Programming	Todd Douglas Miller	Won	
Primetime Emmy Awards	September 14, 2020	Outstanding Sound Editing for a Nonfiction or Reality Program (Single or Multi-Camera)	Eric Milano	Won	
Primetime Emmy Awards	September 14, 2020	Outstanding Sound Mixing for a Nonfiction or Reality Program (Single or Multi-Camera)	Eric Milano	Won	

== See also ==
- Footprints on the Moon, a 1969 documentary film by Bill Gibson and Barry Coe about the Apollo 11 mission
- Moonwalk One, a 1970 documentary film by Theo Kamecke
- For All Mankind, an Oscar-nominated 1989 documentary film by Al Reinert about the Apollo program (1969–1972), featuring the music of Brian Eno
- Apollo 11 in popular culture
