= Footprints on the Moon (1969 film) =

- Directed by: Bill Gibson
- Produced by: Barry Coe
- Narrated by: Wernher von Braun
- Cinematography: Buzz Aldrin; Neil Armstrong; Michael Collins; Leon Shamroy (prologue)
- Edited by: John F. Link Jr.
- Production company: Barry Coe Productions
- Distributed by: 20th Century Fox
- Release dates: September 17, 1969 (Tucson, Arizona)
- Running time: 95 minutes
- Country: United States
- Language: English

Footprints on the Moon (full title: Footprints on the Moon: Apollo 11) is a 1969 documentary film covering the flight of Apollo 11 from vehicle rollout to Splashdown and recovery. It was directed by Bill Gibson and produced by Barry Coe (neither of whom have any other credits listed on the IMDb), and is narrated by Wernher von Braun, with Pierre Jalbert doing additional voiceover as Jules Verne. It was edited by John F. Link Jr., who would later be nominated for his editing work on the 1988 film Die Hard. It is largely assembled from a variety of NASA and other news footage, with montage scenes assembled from still images standing in where no motion picture footage exists. The score includes Philip Moody's Laguna Concerto, a short work for piano and orchestra.

Although Footprints on the Moon was the only contemporary theatrically released documentary of Apollo 11, it was almost forgotten (except for an occasional showing on television) for decades, until it was released on DVD in early 2010, missing the 40th anniversary of the Apollo 11 landing by less than a year.

== See also ==
- List of American films of 1969
- Moonwalk One, a 1970 documentary film by Theo Kamecke
- For All Mankind, a 1989 documentary film by Al Reinert about the Apollo program (1969–1972)
- Apollo 11, a 2019 documentary film by Todd Douglas Miller
- Apollo 11 in popular culture
