= Jack Clemons =

American aerospace engineer (1943–2024)

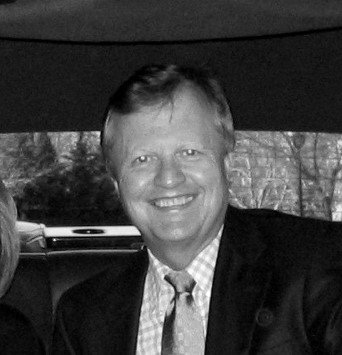
- Clemons in 2005
- Born: November 9, 1943
- Died: May 29, 2024 (aged 80)
- Education: University of Florida
- Engineering career
- Discipline: Aerospace
- Institutions: NASA
- Employer: TRW Systems Group
- Projects: Apollo and Space Shuttle programs

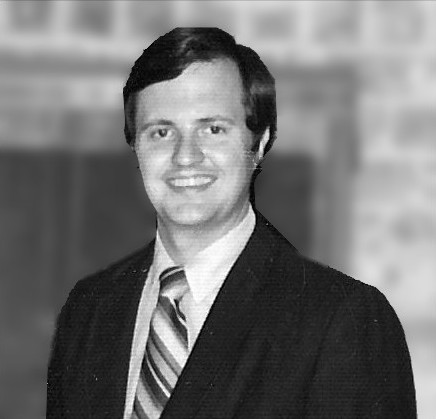
Jack Clemons Clear Lake City, Texas 1972

Jack Clemons (November 9, 1943 – May 29, 2024) was an aerospace engineer and air and space industry professional. He was a lead engineer on NASA's Apollo and Space Shuttle Programs, and later an aerospace company executive. He appeared as himself in the "Command Module" episode of the 2008 Discovery Science Channel six-part documentary Moon Machines. He also appeared as himself in the 2019 National Geographic Channel documentary Apollo: Back to the Moon. Following retirement from the aerospace industry, Clemons was a consultant and a professional writer as well as a speaker and presenter on NASA's space programs.

== Career ==
Jack received his bachelor's and master's degrees in Aerospace Engineering from the University of Florida. During the Apollo Moon Program he was a lead engineer at TRW Systems Group in Houston, Texas, supporting operations at NASA's Manned Spacecraft Center (now the Johnson Space Center). He developed procedures allowing astronauts to monitor the Apollo Command Module Onboard Guidance and Navigation Computer during atmospheric reentry, and to control the reentry manually should they need to override the computer. He provided real-time reentry support during missions Apollo 9 through Apollo 14, including NASA Mission Control Center backroom support during the extended five-minute reentry blackout period on Apollo 13.

Following Apollo, at IBM Federal Systems in Houston, he was the overall program manager for the development of the onboard software for NASA's Space Shuttle. Driven by a NASA requirement for "error-free" code, Shuttle Flight Software became the first program rated at CMM Level 5, the highest rating of the Software Engineering Institute's Capability Maturity Model. As a member of the IBM team, Jack worked early on with Shuttle astronauts to design the onboard computer displays, and later provided problem analysis and flight support during the first six Space Shuttle missions.

In the 1990s and 2000s, Clemons was Senior Vice President of Engineering at Lockheed Martin Air Traffic Control Company in Rockville, Maryland. His organization designed and implemented the hardware and software required to support the modernization of the FAA's nationwide Air Traffic Control computer systems, and the United Kingdom's London Area Air Traffic Control Centre, as well as systems in Scotland, Eastern Europe, South America, and New Zealand.

Following retirement from Lockheed Martin, Clemons was an aerospace consultant as well as a speaker and presenter on NASA's space programs. His non-fiction book Safely to Earth: The Men and Women Who Brought the Astronauts Home, a memoir of his time on NASA's Apollo and Space Shuttle programs, was published by University Press of Florida in September 2018.

As a professional writer Clemons' works of fiction earned him an Established Artist Fellowship Grant for Literary Fiction by the Delaware Division of the Arts and membership in the Science Fiction and Fantasy Writers of America. His hidden history book The Outliers, a Wild West novel set on the East Coast, was published by Secant Publishing of Salisbury, MD in 2021.
