= RKK Energiya museum =

Space museum in Korolyov, Russia

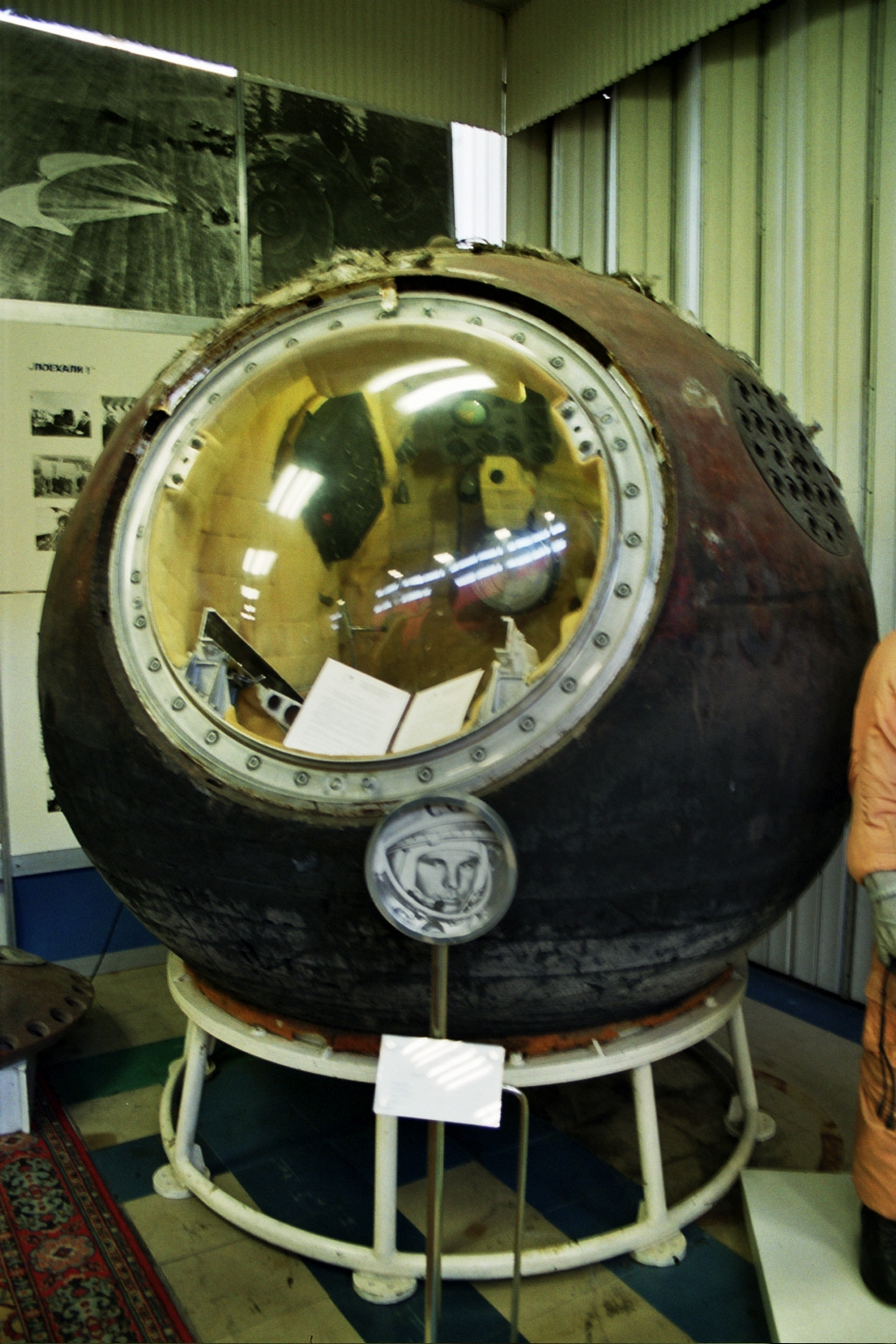
- The Vostok 1 capsule which flew Yuri Gagarin, the first human into space.

- Location within Moscow
- Location: RKK Energiya factory in Korolyov, near Moscow, Russia
- Coordinates: 55°45′20″N 37°36′35″E

The RKK Energiya museum is a museum dedicated to the early achievements of Russian space exploration programmes. It is located on the grounds of the RKK Energiya factory in Korolyov, near Moscow. The date of the company founding is considered on August 26, 1946, when with the order of Dmitriy Ustinov as part of the Special Design Bureau of the NII-88 was formed, department No. 3 for the design of long-range missiles. Sergey Pavlovich Korolev was appointed chief designer department of 130 people. It was this department in 1951 that was transformed into OKB-1 - now RKK Energia. Since 1991, the corporation has the name of the chief designer Korolev.

Amongst the exhibits are the recovered capsule from the Vostok 1 mission with which Yuri Gagarin became the first man in space, the Vostok 6 capsule in which Valentina Tereshkova became the first woman in space, the Voskhod 2 capsule from which the first spacewalk was performed by Alexei Leonov, the Zond 5 capsule which carried two tortoises around the Moon in 1968, and the Soyuz 19 capsule used in the 1975 Apollo-Soyuz Test Project.

== Exhibits ==
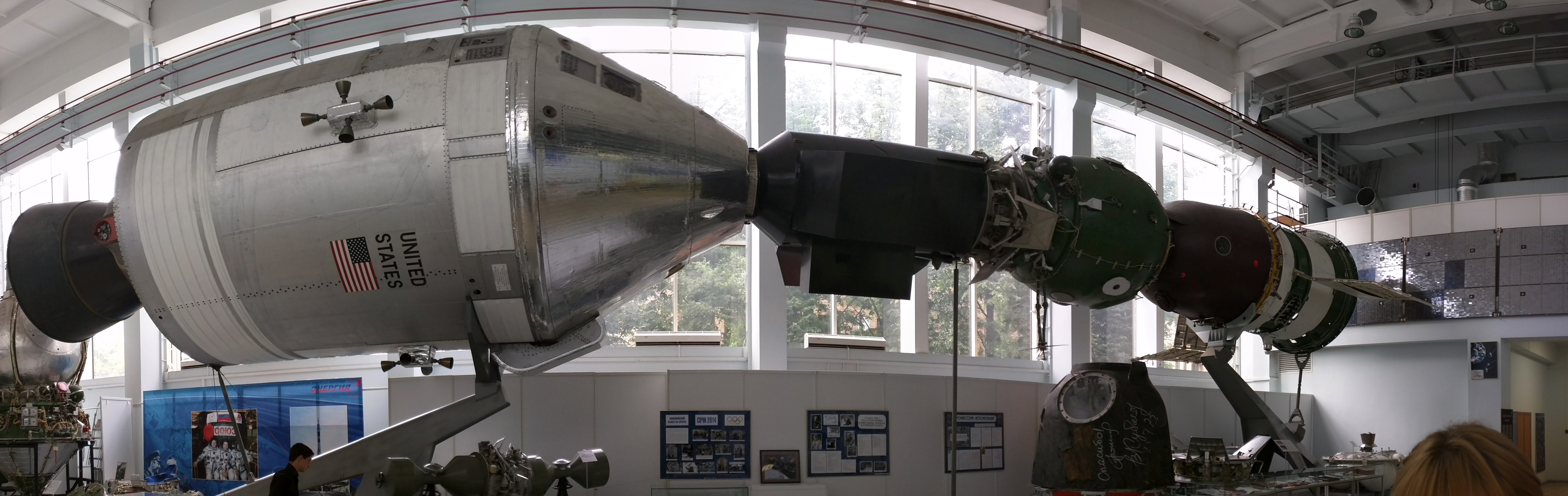
Model of joined Apollo and Soyuz, with the actual Soyuz 19 descent module visible to the lower right

- Elektron 1
- Elektron 2
- Mir with Kvant module
- Molnya 1
- Luna 2
- Luna 3
- Luna 9
- Sputnik 2
- Sputnik 3
- Venera 3
- Voskhod 2
- Vostok 1
- Vostok 6
- Soyuz 19 (used in the Apollo–Soyuz Test Project)
- Soyuz 22
- Soyuz orbital module
- Soyuz TM control panel
- Spacesuits
- Zond 5

== See also ==
- Tsiolkovsky State Museum of the History of Cosmonautics
- List of aerospace museums
- National Air and Space Museum, United States equivalent museum
