= John F. Link =

American film editor (1935–2026)

John F. Link Jr.
- Born: John Frederick Link; July 16, 1935; Los Angeles, California, U.S.
- Died: August 9, 2026 (aged 91); Huntersville, North Carolina, U.S.
- Occupation: Film editor
- Years active: 1969–2000
- Father: John F. Link Sr.

John Frederick Link Jr. (July 16, 1935 – August 9, 2026) was an American film and television editor. He is most well known for his editing work on Predator and Die Hard, the latter of which he was nominated for an Academy Award.

== Early life ==
His father, John F. Link Sr., was also a film editor, and was also nominated for an Academy Award: for the 1943 film, For Whom the Bell Tolls. Link was one of several assistant editors on the film.

== Career ==
That same year he was the sole editor on the documentary, Footprints on the Moon. Both the film and the documentary have his credit as John F. Link Jr., making attribution easy. His next project was another documentary, Say Goodbye in 1971, which was nominated for an Academy Award for Best Documentary (Feature). During the 1970s he worked in both television and film. Notable films he edited during this period include: The King of Marvin Gardens (1972), starring Jack Nicholson, Bruce Dern, and Ellen Burstyn; the 1973 cult classic Electra Glide in Blue (which he co-edited with two others); Race with the Devil (1975), starring Peter Fonda and Warren Oates; and the 1976 Jeff Bridges' comedy-drama film, Stay Hungry, which also starred Sally Field and Arnold Schwarzenegger.

In the 1980s, in addition to his Academy Award-nominated work on Die Hard, Link again worked on two Schwarzenegger films, 1985's Commando and the 1987 blockbuster, Predator. Following these he worked on Die Hard, ending the decade with editing the 1989 cult classic, Road House. The 1990s dawned with Link working on the Steven Seagal action thriller Hard to Kill. This was followed by the action-comedy film If Looks Could Kill starring Richard Grieco. Other notable films he edited during the decade include The Hand That Rocks the Cradle, a psychological thriller starring Annabella Sciorra and Rebecca De Mornay; the Walt Disney production of Alexandre Dumas' classic novel, The Three Musketeers; the Keenen Ivory Wayans comedy, A Low Down Dirty Shame, with Charles S. Dutton and Jada Pinkett; another Disney Film, The Big Green in 1995 starring Olivia d'Abo and Steve Guttenberg; and the Jean-Claude Van Damme martial arts film, The Quest; and the superhero action film Steel, based upon the DC Comics character Steel, starring Shaquille O'Neal. The last film for which he received credit as an editor was 1999 slasher film, Cherry Falls, directed by Geoffrey Wright, and starring Brittany Murphy, Jay Mohr, and Michael Biehn.

== Death ==
Link died in Huntersville, North Carolina, on August 9, 2026, at the age of 91.

== Filmography ==
(as per AFI's database, unless otherwise footnoted)

Editor
Year	Film	Director	Notes	Ref.
1961	The Sergeant Was a Lady	Bernard Glasser		
1965	The Desert Raven	Alan S. Lee		
1972	The King of Marvin Gardens	Bob Rafelson	First collaboration with Bob Rafelson	
1973	Electra Glide in Blue	James William Guercio		
1974	Chosen Survivors	Sutton Roley		
1975	Sunburst	James Polakof		
1975	Race with the Devil	Jack Starrett		
1976	Stay Hungry	Bob Rafelson	Second collaboration with Bob Rafelson	
1977	Handle with Care	Jonathan Demme		
1980	Borderline	Jerrold Freedman		
1985	Commando	Mark L. Lester		
1987	Predator	John McTiernan	First collaboration with John McTiernan	
1988	Die Hard	John McTiernan	Second collaboration with John McTiernan	
1989	Road House	Rowdy Herrington		
1990	Hard to Kill	Bruce Malmuth		
1991	If Looks Could Kill	William Dear		
1992	The Hand That Rocks the Cradle	Curtis Hanson		
1992	The Mighty Ducks	Stephen Herek	First collaboration with Stephen Herek	
1993	The Three Musketeers	Stephen Herek	Second collaboration with Stephen Herek	
1994	D2: The Mighty Ducks	Sam Weisman		
1994	A Low Down Dirty Shame	Keenen Ivory Wayans		
1995	The Big Green	Holly Goldberg Sloan		
1996	The Quest	Jean-Claude Van Damme		
1997	Steel	Kenneth Johnson		
1999	Cherry Falls	Geoffrey Wright		

Editorial department
Year	Film	Director	Role	Notes
1957	The Storm Rider	Edward Bernds	Supervising editor	
1959	The Immoral Mr. Teas	Russ Meyer	Assistant editor	Uncredited
1969	Mackenna's Gold	J. Lee Thompson	Associate film editor	

Sound department
Year	Film	Director	Role
1967	Hurry Sundown	Otto Preminger	Sound effects editor

Documentaries

Editor
Year	Film	Director	Ref.
1969	Footprints on the Moon – Apollo 11	Bill Gibson	
1971	Say Goodbye	David H. Vowell	
1979	The Bermuda Triangle	Richard Friedenberg	

TV movies

Editor
Year	Film	Director
1971	They've Killed President Lincoln!	Robert Guenette
1971	Revenge!	Jud Taylor
1972	Heat of Anger	Don Taylor
1973	The Norliss Tapes	Dan Curtis
1973	The President's Plane Is Missing	Daryl Duke
1973	Message to My Daughter	Robert Michael Lewis
1974	The Last Angry Man	Jerrold Freedman
1974	The Day the Earth Moved	Robert Michael Lewis
1975	Someone I Touched	Lou Antonio
1977	Murder at the World Series	Andrew V. McLaglen
1977	I'm a Fool	Noel Black
1977	Incredible Rocky Mountain Race	James L. Conway
1978	Lawman Without a Gun	Jerrold Freedman
1979	The Streets of L.A.	Jerrold Freedman
1980	Make Me an Offer	Jerry Paris
1981	Killing at Hell's Gate	Jerry Jameson
1982	The Renegades	Roger Spottiswoode
1982	Skeezer	Peter H. Hunt
1983	Starflight: The Plane That Couldn't Land	Jerry Jameson
1983	Tiger Town	Alan Shapiro
1984	Threesome	Lou Antonio
1985	Lace II	William Hale
1986	Harem	William Hale
1988	Promised a Miracle	Stephen Gyllenhaal
1988	Nightmare at Bittercreek	Tim Burstall

TV series

Editor
Year	Title	Notes
1954–56	Cavalcade of America	8 episodes
1974	Firehouse	1 episode
1984	Lace	2 episodes
1985	Lace II	2 episodes
1987	The Hitchhiker	7 episodes

Editorial department
Year	Title	Role	Notes
1954–55	Cavalcade of America	Supervising editor	5 episodes
1955	The Christophers	Supervising editor	1 episode

Producer
Year	Title	Credit	Notes
1969	Public Eye	Associate producer	7 episodes
