= Say Goodbye (film) =

1971 American nature documentary film

- Directed by: David H. Vowell
- Written by: David H. Vowell
- Produced by: Warren Bush; Joan Meyerson; Kenneth E. Stager; David H. Vowell
- Narrated by: Rod McKuen
- Cinematography: Allen Daviau
- Edited by: John F. Link
- Music by: Dory Previn
- Production company: Wolper Productions
- Distributed by: NBC
- Release date: January 8, 1971
- Running time: 52 minutes
- Country: United States
- Language: English

Say Goodbye is a 1971 American documentary film about the relationship between humans and nature, directed by David H. Vowell. It was nominated for the Academy Award for Best Documentary Feature.

It was narrated by poet Rod McKuen, and sponsored by the Ralston Purina pet foods corporation for its initial broadcast. The theme song, "Say Goodbye", was composed and performed by Dory Previn.

The show depicted the plight of various animal species at the hands of man and his influence. Some segments included the clubbing of seals on the Pribilof Islands, the effect of DDT on brown pelican populations in Texas, and the plight of severely endangered animals.

In one segment, various species were shown, with the narration reciting how many animals were left in the world. Included were black-footed ferrets, prairie chickens, and many more. One was the Japanese crested ibis. A small flock of the bright white birds was seen from overhead against the backdrop of a beautiful, verdant forest. The narrator said, "there are 11 left in the world; you are seeing eight of them." In the decades since, a Chinese effort to preserve the species has resulted in about a fifteen-fold increase in their population.
