= Charlie Morrow =

- Born: Charles Morrow; 1942 (age 83–84); Newark, New Jersey, U.S.
- Occupations: Sound artist, composer, performer
- Website: www.charliemorrow.com

Charlie Morrow (born Charles Morrow, February 9, 1942) is an American sound artist, composer, conceptualist, and performer. His creative projects have included chanting and healing works, museum and gallery installations, large-scale festival events, radio and TV broadcasts, film soundtracks, commercial sound design, and advertising jingles.

== Education and influences ==
Morrow was born in Newark, New Jersey, and grew up in Rutherford and Passaic, New Jersey. His parents were both psychiatrists.

He started playing trumpet at age 10, and then took up bugle. Subsequently has also performed using conch shells, cow and goat horns, Jew’s harp, ocarina and homemade electronics. His work has focused on breath, vocalization, gesture and mental dream states.

Morrow attended Columbia College (1958–1961), where his teachers included composer Otto Luening and, importantly, ethnomusicologist Willard Rhodes, who introduced Morrow to oral cultures and shamanic traditions.

In 1963, Morrow received a Diploma in Composition from Mannes College of Music where his teachers had included Stefan Wolpe and William Jay Sydeman. During this time, he also encountered figures from the New York avant garde, notably Philip Corner. Morrow performed with Corner in the Tone Roads Ensemble which also featured James Tenney and Malcolm Goldstein, and through Corner he met radical figures including John Cage and Fluxus artist Alison Knowles.

In 1964 Morrow met his most important collaborator, poet Jerome Rothenberg, who was then teaching at Mannes. Between 1974 and 1989 they were co-directors of The New Wilderness Foundation, which staged concerts, published EAR Magazine and New Wilderness Letter and issued cassette recordings under the New Wilderness Audiographics imprint.

== Compositions ==
Negotiation with the musical past was an element in Morrow’s compositional thinking, along with a taste for musical pranks. His "Very Slow Gabrieli" (1957) is a dramatically slowed down realization of Giovanni Gabrieli’s “Sonata Pian’ e Forte” for double brass ensemble. A later collage work, “Book of Hours of Catherine of Cleves” (1992), shows a mature late twentieth-century imagination engaging in unexpected ways with late medieval style.

Morrow’s conceptualist orientation has led him to write a series of Wave pieces, which involve “herds” of a single instrument, such as “Wave Music I” for 40 cellos or “Wave Music VII” for 30 harps.

== Events ==
Early in his career Morrow organized his own concerts, including “New Music for Trumpet and Ensemble” at Carnegie Hall. But in 1973, after “An Evening with the Two Charlies”, a programme of pieces by Morrow and Charles Ives presented at Lincoln Center, he turned away from the concert hall, preferring to work in public spaces, parks, harbours and city streets. “I became more interested in working with environmental acoustics rather than the blank canvas of the concert hall, where you remove all other sound in order to create your own,” Morrow has explained. Most of his event compositions are immersive and defy capture; Morrow has consequently released few recordings.,

During the mid-1960s Morrow helped Charlotte Moorman organize her acclaimed annual Avant Garde Festival in New York City. Morrow has subsequently worked with professional musicians, such as singer Joan La Barbara in The New Wilderness Preservation Band and percussionist Glen Velez in the Horizontal-Vertical Band. But involving members of the public and participation by non-specialists has been a consistent goal of Morrow’s work. He conceived the Ocarina Orchestra as an ensemble that could be musically effective without requiring technical expertise.

Morrow has played in a variety of musical contexts over the years, including Derek Bailey’s Company at London’s ICA in 1981. He has also provided sympathetic musical accompaniment for numerous poets over the years, including Allen Ginsberg. In April 1980 Morrow and Swedish sound poet Sten Hanson organized the 12th International Sound Poetry Festival, at Washington Square Church in New York City.

In 1973, Morrow organized a Summer Solstice celebration, the first in a series staged annually in New York until 1989. Increasingly Morrow has shown an interest into integrating radio and television broadcasts into these celebratory occasions. Amongst his other large scale public events Citywave, realised on the streets of Copenhagen in 1985, involved around 2000 participants, including folk singers, bell ringers, rock groups, marching bands, a helicopter and clowns on bicycles.,

In 2010 Finnish pianist Ilmo Ranta performed a concert of Morrow’s piano music at the Sibelius Academy in Helsinki. The programme included his “Requiem for the Victims of Kent State for Solo Piano”, “Soundpiece for Rock Amplified Piano” and more recent “Mozart Reconstructions: Sonatas K331, 332 for piano and midi piano, a 3D spatial work with sound environments.

The Little Charlie Festival, a five-day celebration of Morrow’s life and work held in New York City during Fall 2010, gave some indication of the category-defying scope of his creative activity.

== Commercial work ==
It was Art Garfunkel, one of Morrow’s classmates at Columbia College, who introduced him to the commercial music business. Morrow then worked as arranger and line producer for John H. Hammond at Columbia Records, and provided arrangements for hit recordings by Simon & Garfunkel, The Rascals, Vanilla Fudge and The Balloon Farm.

== Sound installations ==
Morrow installations range from sound drawers and cabinets to wind sails to electronic environments.

In 1969, painter Carol Brown invited Morrow to create a piece for the Marilyn Monroe Show at New York’s Janis Gallery. He created a soundscape portrait of Monroe using collaged found sound.

Venues for Morrow’s later sound installations have included Knoll Furniture Retrospective (Louvre Museum, Paris), General Gas Exhibit (Chicago Museum of Science and Industry), 2nd Acustica International (Whitney Museum, New York), an arctic sound room for the Kunst- und Ausstellungshalle, Bonn, the American Museum of Natural History’s Hall of Planet Earth in New York and the Memorial Railroad Museum in Altoona, PA.

In 2000 Morrow created audio work for the National Museum of Natural History exhibition Vikings. He has also created audio tours for Kennedy Space Center, the Great Platte River Road Memorial Archway and the Empire State Building, New York.

Morrow experiments with spatialization and capture of multi-dimensional events led to the development of 3D audio effect True3D spatial software and systems. Installations include Foster and Partners Forteleza Hall at S.C. Johnson Company HQ in Racine, WI, The Smithsonian Institution's Arctic Study Center in Anchorage, Alaska, Nationwide Children's Hospital in Columbus, Ohio, and the Football Performance Center at the University of Oregon, Eugene, Oregon.

== Film, television and soundtracks ==
Morrow has created feature film soundtracks for Frances Thompson’s NASA Moonwalk One, Ken Russell’s Altered States, and Eleanor Antin's Man Without A World. He designed music and sound for the 13 parts of Time-Life's "America" series. His video Paul's Story: A Sami in New York, premiered at The Margaret Mead Film Festival, December 1989. In 2007 he provided score and sound design for Jean-Jacques Lebel’s film Les Avatars du Venus.

== Other media ==
Morrow co-produced T.C. McLuhan’s audio version of her bestselling documentary portrait of Native American life, Touch the Earth.

The interactive CD-ROM, ScruTiny in the Great Round, featuring Morrow’s music and visual art by Tennessee Rice Dixon and Jim Gasperini won the 1996 Grand Prix du Jury Milia d'Or in Cannes, France.

Morrow created a microminiature Haydn Clock Symphony program for Nam Jun Paik's Zapping SLZ104PAC Swatch Watch and transformations of Chopin piano works for Paik's video installation at the Palace of Versailles.

== Public presentations ==
Morrow was Visiting Professor of Spatial Sound, VMK Esbjerg, Denmark, 2007-2009. He has lectured on sound art and design at numerous prestigious venues including The Aspen Design Conference, Columbia University, Oberlin College, Helsinki University of Technology, Copenhagen University, Cornell University and St. Martin’s College of Art, London.

In 2004 Morrow participated in the Future of Sound event at the British Academy Awards, co-produced the New Sound New York Sound Cube show at The Kitchen, and had a solo sound art show in the MUU Gallery, Helsinki.

Morrow currently resides in Helsinki, Finland and Barton, Vermont.

== Discography ==
The Birth of the War God Music by Charlie Morrow, texts by Jerome Rothenberg, sung by The Western Wind. (Laurel Records, 1988)

Toot! (Triple CD, XI Recordings, 2011)
