= Moonwalk One =

- 2009 release cover from the director's cut
- Directed by: Theo Kamecke
- Written by: Theo Kamecke; Peretz Johnnes; E.G.Valens
- Produced by: Francis Thompson Inc. Peretz W. Johnnes
- Starring: Neil Armstrong; Michael Collins; Buzz Aldrin
- Narrated by: Laurence Luckinbill
- Cinematography: Urs Furrer; Hideaki Kobayashi
- Edited by: Pat Powell; Richard Rice; Theo Kamecke
- Music by: Charles Morrow
- Distributed by: NASA
- Release date: 1971
- Running time: 96 minutes (1971 release); 106 minutes (2009 release)
- Country: United States
- Language: English

Moonwalk One is a 1971 feature-length documentary film about the flight of Apollo 11, which landed the first humans on the Moon. Besides portraying the massive technological achievement of that event, the film places it in some historical context and tries to capture the mood and the feel of the people on Earth when man first walked on another world.

== Original 1970 release ==
After the film was completed in 1969 there was not much interest in it because the general public had been saturated with the US space program, especially with several other lunar missions which followed Apollo 11 over the next three years. NASA gave the film a screening in New York City for possible distributors, but it was considered to be too long, and subsequently failed to be picked up. To counter this lack of interest about 15 minutes was cut from the finished film at NASA's direction. This failed to gain renewed interest from distributors, but the film was shown at the Cannes Film Festival in the summer of 1971, where it won a special award and was described as a "sleeper". The Whitney Museum of American Art in New York began a new film series called "New American Directors", and Moonwalk One was placed in its first program. It received many favorable reviews and was thereafter screened in a selection of theaters nationally, capitalizing on the publicity due to the Whitney program.

== 2009 re-release ==
In 2009 a 35mm print of the film was telecined, and re-released in a special "Director's Cut" edition under the supervision of Theo Kamecke. The DVD includes a director's commentary, the story of the making of the film and other features. This version first premiered on Monday July 20, 2009.

== History of the making of Moonwalk One ==
A year and a half before the Apollo 11 flight, NASA had approached Francis Thompson Inc about making a very ambitious film telling the story of the whole Apollo program, culminating with the landing on the Moon. Francis Thompson and his partner Alexander Hammid were at that time generally regarded as the best documentary filmmakers in the USA, having won fame as the creators of the hit of the 1964-65 New York World's Fair To Be Alive!, a multi-screen film which played to overflow crowds and garnered the Academy Award for Documentary Short Subject in 1966. The NASA film had the working title of Man in Space. It was to be a theatrical production of several million dollars at minimum, with funding and distribution supplied by MGM, and would have included a re-enactment of the moonwalk on a sound stage.

The Francis Thompson company even conducted preliminary shooting during one or two of the earlier Apollo missions, but in early 1969 because of reshuffling at MGM, the project lost its backing. Both Francis Thompson and NASA frantically sought funding elsewhere but nothing resulted, and Thompson began to turn his attention to another project. Six weeks before the launch of Apollo 11, NASA called again and said that although the big-budget film was obviously dead, they did not want this event to 'slip through their fingers', nor did they want to make the kind of industrial film which was usually produced after each mission. NASA said they could scrape together $350,000 and wanted to know if Thompson could do anything with that. Already involved with another project, Francis turned to Theo Kamecke, who had edited To Be Alive! and had since gone on to direct other films independently. Bill Johnnes came on board as line producer because he had been involved with the ill-fated MGM production and was already familiar with many of the necessary contacts.

== Stonehenge and Moonwalk One ==
Since the time was so short, Kamecke's immediate challenge was to scout the location, determine what to shoot, and select the several film crews that were going to be necessary for capturing an event happening over a very short period of time. It was during this scouting trip to Cape Canaveral that the idea came to him to begin the film with Stonehenge, which he had seen on a sunless dawn the year before while in England shooting another film. The two efforts, Apollo and Stonehenge, seemed inseparable.

At the moment of the Apollo 11 launch, Kamecke had asked his camera crews to resist the temptation to look at the launch themselves, but instead concentrate on the faces of the people watching. He himself was in Launch Control with a NASA cameraman and was the only civilian ever issued a pass to the Firing Room. During the moonwalk he was in Mission Control MOCR in Houston, Texas. The remainder of the film was researched and planned out after the launch in July, and the treatment written and delivered just a short time before the trip to England to film Stonehenge.

== NASA and Moonwalk One ==
In the weeks before the launch Theo Kamecke flew to Washington D.C. to meet the appropriate people at NASA, and get his bearings on the film. He was hoping that because they had come to Francis Thompson in the first place, they wouldn't be wanting a laundry-list type of film. The man who ran Public Relations for NASA, Julian Shear, had come from a substantial career in television broadcasting, was very savvy, and knew that by the time the film was finished the public would already be saturated with media about Apollo, and that the film would have no box office appeal. He asked Kamecke not to worry about that, but just to make a time capsule.

== Elements of the film ==
Aside from all the predictable footage available from NASA (16mm, video and stills shot during the mission, and views from space shot during other missions), there were huge pieces to be filled in. Stock footage researchers were set to the task of finding newsreel footage of the time, and beautiful and unusual footage from around the world to represent both the people and the planet as this event unfolded. The scenes of the making of the spacecraft and suits, and the testing of human endurance were shot in the months following the first moonwalk. The launch sequence itself, with all the slow motion shots of flame, smoke and falling ice were put together from engineering film shot by cameras on the Launch Pad and tower. In looking through a technical manual he obtained from NASA, Kamecke noticed that besides the three or four shots of the launch which had been allocated for media purposes, there were 240 film cameras automatically triggered at launch. He asked where that other footage was, and was told that they didn't know but could find out. It turned out that after development, that film was sent down to the rocket research center in Huntsville, Alabama.

Kamecke traveled to Huntsville and found that footage tossed into two cardboard cartons sitting under a workbench. The engineers were only interested in it if something blew up or if some propellant hose didn't disconnect properly. After that, it was disposed of. Kamecke looked through it and selected several reels to box up and take back to New York. Most of them were on 16mm and were taken at such a high frame rate that they seemed to be hardly moving at all, so it was determined how much to speed them up while still seeming slow motion, and were sent to an optical house to be blown up to 35mm.

== Opticals ==
There were many "opticals" used in the making of Moonwalk One. The Earth rising over the Moon, or the pan from the Earth floating in space to the close surface of the Moon, for example. There was no footage shot by the astronauts that was comparable. The "Earth Poem" sequence was composed of Hasselblad stills of the Earth taken by astronauts on previous missions, and sent to an optical house to create very slow moves across the surface.

The animated explanation for how the Apollo-Saturn rocket was put together, how it functioned and how each expended piece was left behind leaving only the Command Module Columbia to plummet back to Earth, was intended to look like simple computer animation. In 1970 even the simplest computer animation was so expensive and time consuming to do that it was far cheaper to do cell animation, where each image was drawn on a clear acetate just like Mickey Mouse cartoons. The 2019 documentary Apollo 11 pays homage to Moonwalk One by re-using the designs for the animated spacecraft in genuine computer animations.

== Music and sound effects ==
The composer selected for Moonwalk One was Charles Morrow, who had developed a reputation for very flexible, avant garde, and stirring compositions by the late 1960s. For the "Earth Poem" sequence he came up with heartbeat, breathing, and a very moving cello line.

In places throughout the film, telemetry sounds from spacecraft were integrated so that they themselves became the music. None of these telemetry sounds were from Apollo, because by that time telemetry was so rapid and of such frequency that even slowed down was inaudible to the ear. The telemetry sounds were taken from Mariner 4 which flew by Mars many years before, the last time such sounds were audible.

The sound of the Apollo rocket launch is a mix of V2 rocket and atom bomb punctuated by slowed down struck metal which emulates cathedral bells, creating a thread with the slowed down brass in the Stonehenge music which bookends the film and the pipe organ score linking the Apollo 11 rocket flight with micro and macro universes.

== Narrator ==
According to the film's director Theo Kamecke speaking to filmmaker Christopher Riley on the director's commentary of the 2009 film release the narrator, Laurence Luckinbill, was selected because he was not a narrator but an actor who had not only the voice but the temperament to understand the feel of the film.

== Production of the finished film ==
Because the footage for the film originated from so many sources – 70mm, 35mm, 16mm, video, stills – it was necessary to settle on a format very early in production that would accommodate all these sources without making it obvious that the film was jumping from one source to another. The original specifications for the film, left over from the MGM co-production concept, were for it to be filmed in 70mm. There was not time before the launch to reconsider this, and so the launch crews were working with a few 70mm cameras and some 35mm. After the moonwalk Kamecke went to the people at NASA and explained that the film really couldn't be done in 70mm for the budget allowed because of the cost of film and processing, the unwieldiness of the equipment, and the slowness of the lenses which would require more lighting and thus larger crews. It was decided to release the film in 35mm in the traditional 4:3 screen ratio, which would accommodate not only the footage shot by the astronauts, but all of the stock footage as well. The 70mm footage would have to be reduced to 35mm masters, selecting the optimum part of the 70mm frame.

The finished film was assembled and printed by Technicolor in California, using the same system that had produced all the great Hollywood color films from the 1930s through the 1960s. The process was called dye transfer, in which black and white fine-grain masters were created for each of the colors, run through a bath of ink, and contact printed onto clear acetate, one after the other, just as books would have been printed. It was quite a bit more expensive than using light-sensitive film which would then be chemically developed, but the clarity and control was more exact and of better quality than light-sensitive stock. By the time Moonwalk One was finished, light-sensitive emulsion film had become much better technically and was much cheaper than the Technicolor process. Moonwalk One was one of the last American films created using the process.

== Reception ==
Critics gave the film positive reviews. ABC News reported that Moonwalk One was the first documentary worthy of the immensity of the Moon launch itself, and Cue Magazine described it in 1972 as an extraordinary documentary of historical scope and time capsule worthiness. Archer Winsten writing in the New York Post in November 1972 declared that it deserved to be a companion piece to Stanley Kubrick's 1968 masterwork 2001: A Space Odyssey.

== See also ==
- Footprints on the Moon, a 1969 documentary film by Bill Gibson and Barry Coe, about the Apollo 11 mission
- For All Mankind, a 1989 documentary film by Al Reinert about the Apollo program (1969 – 1972)
- Apollo 11, a 2019 documentary film by Todd Douglas Miller
- Apollo 11 in popular culture
- List of American films of 1970
