= Vostok 1 =

First human spaceflight in history

- Launch of Vostok 1
- Operator: Soviet space program
- Harvard designation: 1961 Mu 1
- COSPAR ID: 1961-012A
- SATCAT no.: 00103
- Mission duration: 1 hour, 48 minutes 1 hour, 46 minutes
- Orbits completed: 1

Spacecraft properties
- Spacecraft: Vostok-3KA No.3
- Manufacturer: Experimental Design Bureau OKB-1
- Launch mass: 4,725 kg (10,417 lb)
- Landing mass: 2,400 kg (5,290 lb)
- Dimensions: 2.30 m (7 ft 6.5 in) diameter

Crew
- Crew size: 1
- Members: Yuri Gagarin
- Callsign: Кедр (Kedr, 'Siberian pine'), or Ласточка (Lastochka, 'Swallow') (Note: The six crewed Vostok missions used names of birds as their call signs, and the Vostok 1 spacecraft was known as Swallow in keeping with this convention. However, due to its special importance, a terrestrial call sign Cedar (or: Siberian Pine) was used for Vostok 1 during flight. This code name was used to camouflage the significance of the mission to potential eavesdroppers until success was assured.)

Start of mission
- Launch date: April 12, 1961, 06:07 UTC
- Rocket: Vostok-K 8K72K
- Launch site: Baikonur, Site 1/5; 45.920278°N 63.342222°E

End of mission
- Landing date: April 12, 1961, 07:55 UTC
- Landing site: 51.270682°N 45.99727°E

Orbital parameters
- Reference system: Geocentric orbit
- Regime: Low Earth orbit
- Perigee altitude: 181 km (112 mi; 98 nmi)
- Apogee altitude: 327 km (203 mi; 177 nmi)
- Inclination: 64.95°
- Period: 89.1 minutes
- Epoch: April 12, 1961
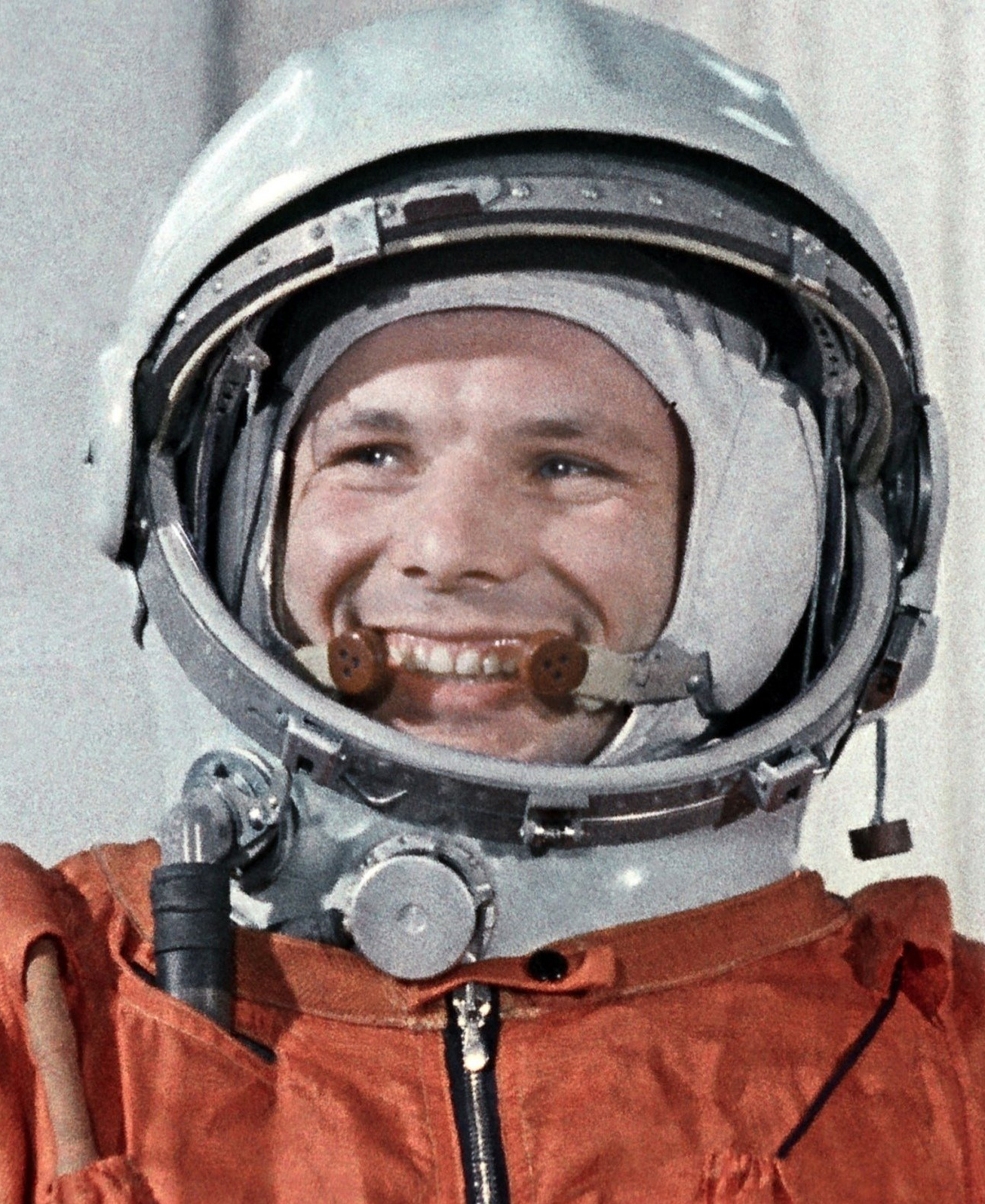
- Yuri Gagarin Vostok program

Vostok 1 (Russian: Восток, lit. 'East' or 'Orient') was the first spaceflight of the Vostok programme and the first human orbital spaceflight in history. The Vostok 3KA space capsule was launched from Baikonur Cosmodrome on 12 April 1961, with Soviet cosmonaut Yuri Gagarin aboard, making him the first human to reach orbital velocity around the Earth and to complete a full orbit around the Earth.

The orbital spaceflight consisted of a single orbit around the Earth that reached a maximum altitude of 327 kilometers (203 miles; 177 nautical miles) and a minimum of 181 kilometers (112 miles; 98 nautical miles). The flight took 108 minutes from launch to landing. Gagarin parachuted to the ground separately from his capsule after ejecting at 7 km (23,000 ft) altitude.

== Background ==
The Space Race between the Soviet Union and the United States, the two Cold War superpowers, began just before the Soviet Union launched the world's first artificial satellite, Sputnik 1, in 1957. Both countries wanted to develop spaceflight technology quickly, particularly by launching the first successful human spaceflight. The Soviet Union secretly pursued the Vostok programme in competition with the United States' Project Mercury. Vostok launched several precursor uncrewed missions between May 1960 and March 1961, to test and develop the Vostok rocket family and space capsule. These missions had varied degrees of success, but the final two—Korabl-Sputnik 4 and Korabl-Sputnik 5—were complete successes, allowing the first crewed flight.

== Pilot ==
The Vostok 1 capsule was designed to carry a single cosmonaut. Yuri Gagarin was chosen as the prime pilot of Vostok 1, with Gherman Titov and Grigori Nelyubov as backups. These assignments were formally made on April 8, four days before the mission, but Gagarin had been a favourite among the cosmonaut candidates for at least several months.

The final decision of who would fly the mission relied heavily on the opinion of the head of cosmonaut training, Nikolai Kamanin. In an April 5 diary entry, Kamanin wrote that he was still undecided between Gagarin and Titov. "The only thing that keeps me from picking [Titov] is the need to have the stronger person for the one day flight." Kamanin was referring to the second mission, Vostok 2, compared to the relatively short single-orbit mission of Vostok 1. When Gagarin and Titov were informed of the decision during a meeting on April 9, Gagarin was very happy, and Titov was disappointed. On 10 April, this meeting was reenacted in front of television cameras, so there would be official footage of the event. This included an acceptance speech by Gagarin. As an indication of the level of secrecy involved, one of the other cosmonaut candidates, Alexei Leonov, later recalled that he did not know who was chosen for the mission until after the spaceflight had begun.

Position	Crew
Pilot	Yuri Gagarin; Only spaceflight

=== Backup ===
Position	Crew
Pilot	Gherman Titov

=== Reserve ===
Position	Crew
Pilot	Grigori Nelyubov

== Preparations ==
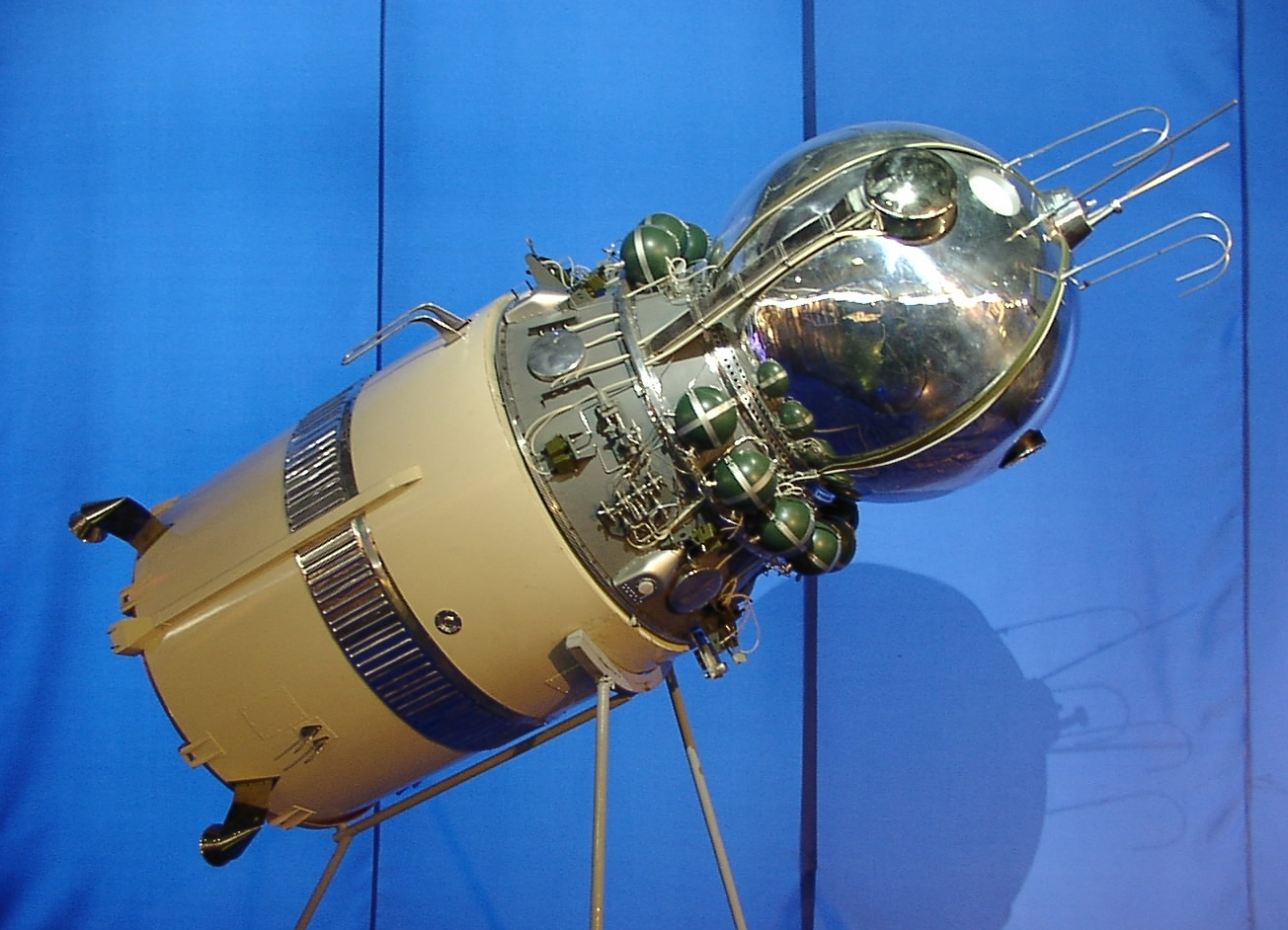
Model of the Vostok spacecraft with its upper stage, on display in Frankfurt Airport's "Russia in Space" exhibition

Unlike later Vostok missions, there were no dedicated tracking ships available to receive signals from the spacecraft. Instead they relied on the network of ground stations, also called Command Points, to communicate with the spacecraft; all of these Command Points were located within the Soviet Union.

Because of weight constraints, there was no backup retrorocket engine. The spacecraft carried 13 days of provisions to allow for survival and natural orbital decay in the event the retrorockets failed. The provisions included food for Gagarin. As focus was made on food that would not form crumbs, Gagarin was provided with liver meat puree and chocolate sauce, packed in metal toothpaste-style tubes.

The letters "СССР" were hand-painted onto Gagarin's helmet by engineer Gherman Lebedev during transfer to the launch site. As it had been less than a year since U-2 pilot Francis Gary Powers was shot down, Lebedev reasoned that without some country identification, there was a small chance the cosmonaut might be mistaken for a spy on landing.

=== Automatic control ===
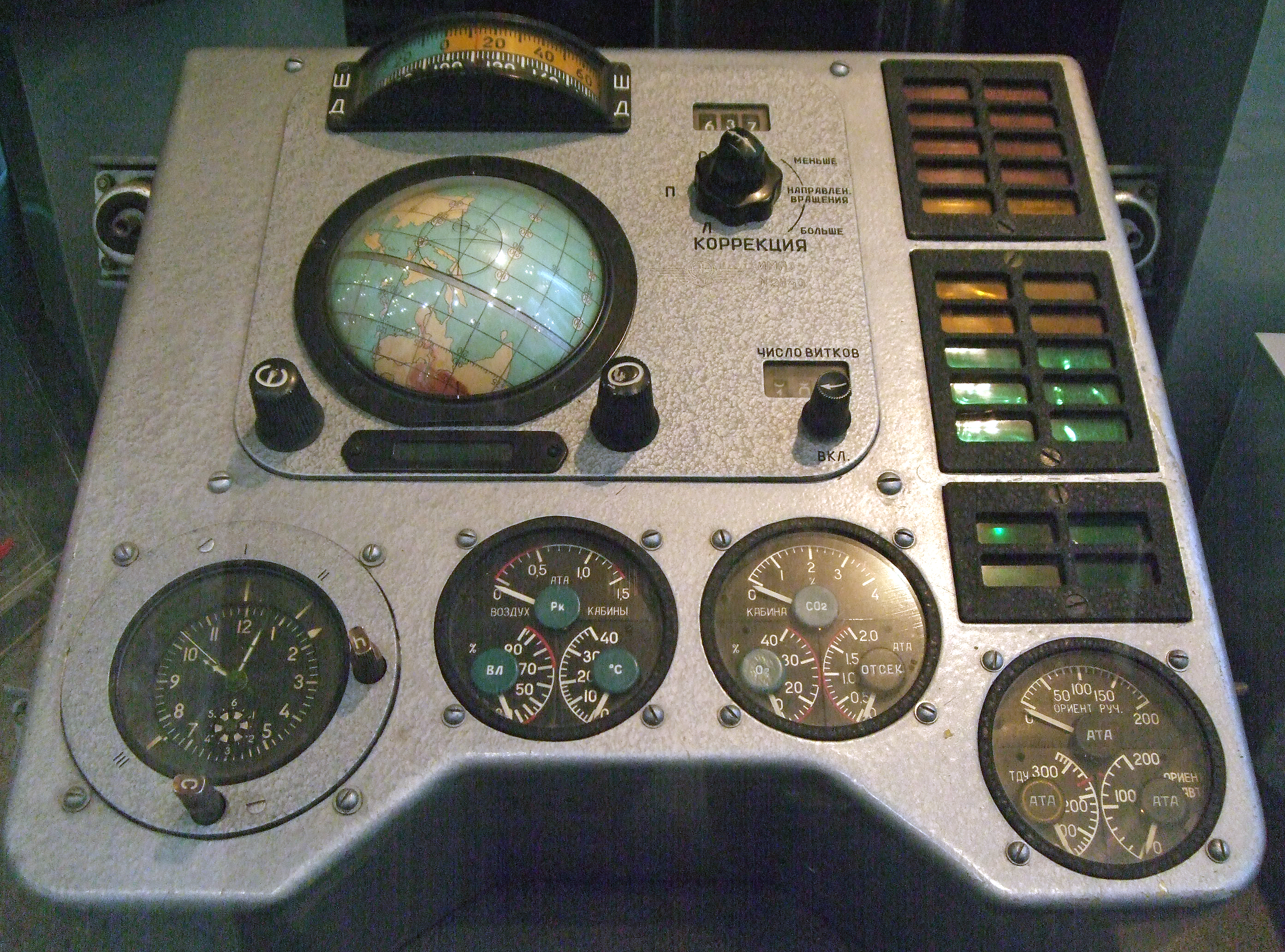
Part of the Vostok 1 instrument panel prominently displaying the "Globus" navigation instrument

The entire mission would be controlled by either automatic systems or by ground control. This was because medical staff and spacecraft engineers were unsure how a human might react to weightlessness, and therefore it was decided to lock the pilot's manual controls. In an unusual move, a code to unlock the controls was placed in an onboard envelope, for Gagarin's use in case of emergency. Prior to the flight, Kamanin and others told Gagarin the code (1-2-5) anyway.

=== 11 April 1961 ===
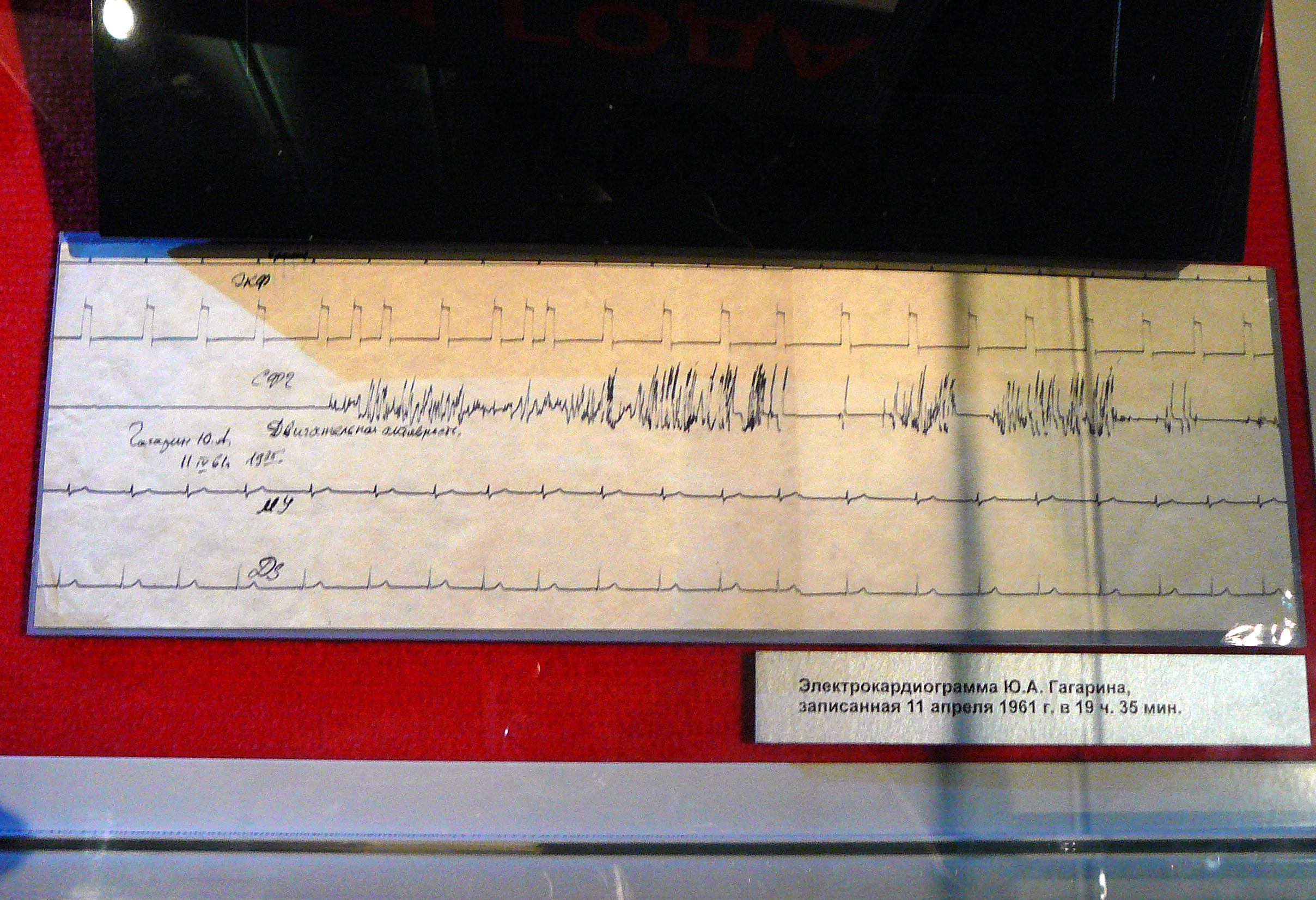
Electrocardiogram of Gagarin recorded 11 April 1961, at 19 hours and 35 minutes. Exhibited at the Memorial Museum of Cosmonautics in Moscow.

At Baikonur Cosmodrome on the morning of 11 April 1961, the Vostok-K rocket, together with the attached Vostok 3KA space capsule, were transported several kilometers to the launch pad, in a horizontal position. Once they arrived at the launch pad, a quick examination of the booster was conducted by technicians to make sure everything was in order. When no visible problems were found, the booster was erected on LC-1. At 10:00 (Moscow Time), Gagarin and Titov were given a final review of the flight plan. They were informed that launch was scheduled to occur the following day, at 09:07 Moscow Time. This time was chosen so that when the capsule started to fly over Africa, which was when the retrorockets would need to fire for reentry, the solar illumination would be ideal for the orientation system's sensors.

At 18:00, once various physiological readings had been taken, the doctors instructed the cosmonauts not to discuss the upcoming missions. That evening Gagarin and Titov relaxed by listening to music, playing pool, and chatting about their childhoods. At 21:50, both men were offered sleeping pills, to ensure a good night's sleep, but they both declined. Physicians had attached sensors to the cosmonauts, to monitor their condition throughout the night, and they believed that both had slept well. Gagarin's biographers Doran and Bizony say that neither Gagarin nor Titov slept that night. Chief Designer Sergei Korolev did not sleep that night, due to anxiety caused by the imminent spaceflight.

=== Gagarin statement before the mission ===
Before the mission, Gagarin made a statement to the press, addressed to the Soviet Union and to the whole world:

Dear friends, both known and unknown to me, fellow countrymen, men and women of all lands and continents!
In a few minutes a mighty spaceship will take me into the far-away expanses of the Universe. What can I say to you in these last minutes before the start? I see my whole past life as one wonderful moment. Everything I have experienced and done till now has been in preparation for this moment. You must realise that it is hard to express my feelings now that the test for which we have been training ardently and long is at hand. I don't have to tell you what I felt when it was suggested that I should make this flight, the first in history. Was it joy? No, it was something more than that. Pride? No, it was not just pride. I felt very happy—to be the first in space, to engage in an unprecedented duel with Nature—could one dream of anything greater than that?
But then I thought of the tremendous responsibility of being the first to accomplish what generations of people had dreamed of, the first to show man the way into space... Can you think of a task more difficult than the one assigned to me. It is not responsibility to a single person, or dozens of people, or even a collective. It is responsibility to all Soviet people, to all mankind, to its present and its future. And if I am nevertheless venturing on this flight, it is because I am a Communist, because I draw strength from unexampled exploits performed by my compatriots, Soviet men and women. I know that I shall muster all my will power the better to do the job. Realising its importance, I will do all I can to carry out the assignment of the Communist Party and the Soviet people.
Am I happy to be starting on a space flight? Of course I am. In all times and all eras man's greatest joy has been to take part in new discoveries.
I would like to dedicate this first space flight to the people of communism, a society which our Soviet people are already entering, and which, I am confident, all men on earth will enter.
It is a matter of minutes now before the start. I say to you good-bye, dear friends, just as people say to each other when setting out on a long journey. I would like very much to embrace you all—people known and unknown to me, close friends and strangers alike.
See you soon!

— Yuri Gagarin

In his autobiography, Gagarin recalled that, looking at the spacecraft before start, he was "seized with an unprecedented rise of all mental strength [...] some extraordinary words were born that I had never used before in everyday speech." This is disputed by historian Asif Siddiqi, who claims the speech "was taped much earlier, in Moscow" and Gagarin "was essentially forced to utter a stream of banalities prepared by anonymous speechwriters" .

== Flight ==
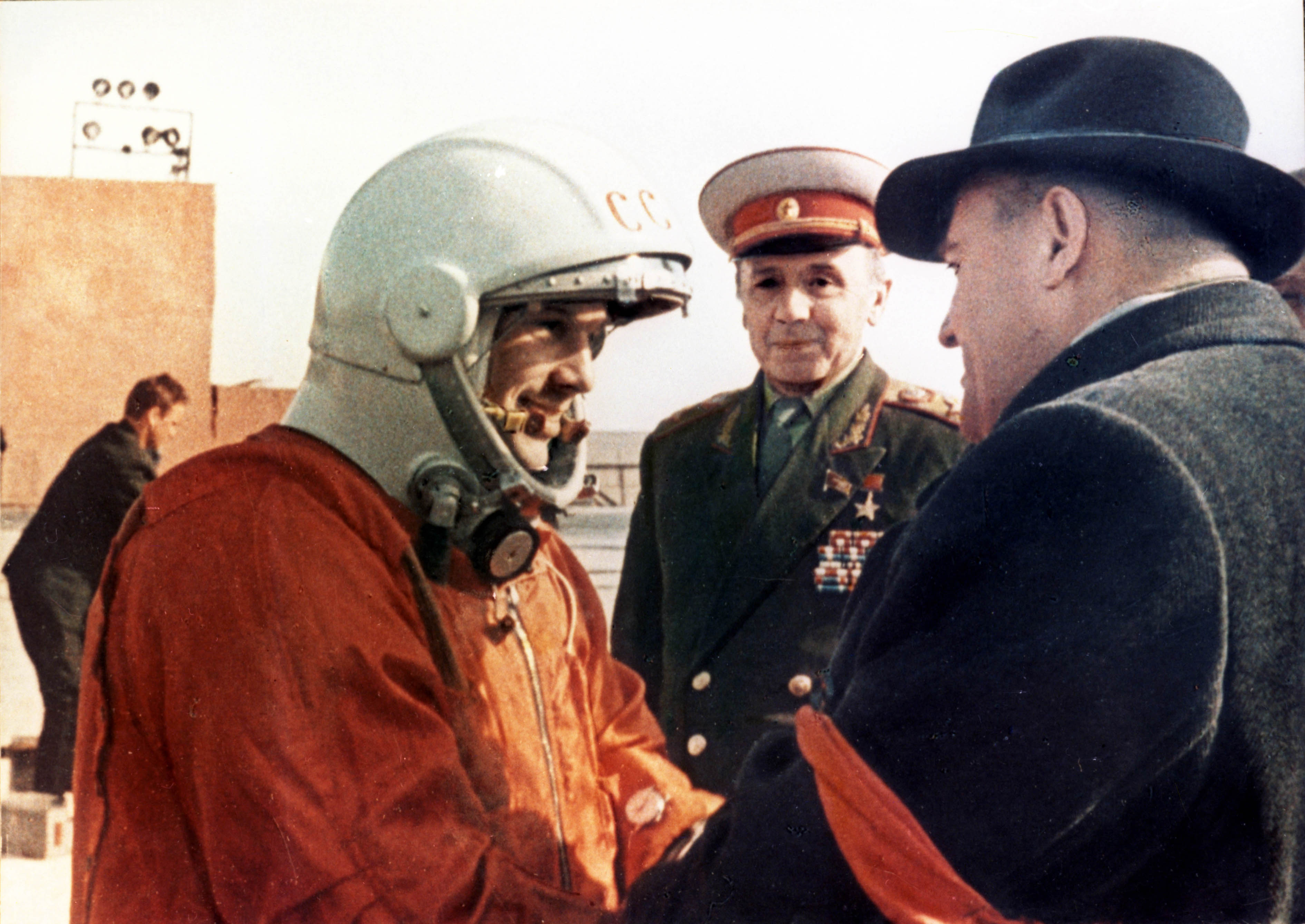
Gagarin with Korolev (right) before the flight

At 05:30 Moscow time, on the morning of 12 April 1961, both Gagarin and his backup Titov were woken. They were given breakfast, assisted into their spacesuits, and then were transported to the launch pad. Gagarin entered the Vostok 1 spacecraft, and at 07:10 local time (04:10 UTC), the radio communication system was turned on. Once Gagarin was in the spacecraft, his picture appeared on television screens in the launch control room from an onboard camera. Launch would not occur for another two hours, and during the time Gagarin chatted with the mission's main CapCom, as well as Chief Designer Sergei Korolev, Nikolai Kamanin, and a few others, periodically joking and singing songs. Following a series of tests and checks, about forty minutes after Gagarin entered the spacecraft, its hatch was closed. Gagarin, however, reported that the hatch was not sealed properly, and technicians spent about 15 minutes removing all the screws and sealing the hatch again. According to a 2014 obituary, Vostok's chief designer, Oleg Ivanovsky, personally helped rebolt the hatch. There is some disagreement over whether the hatch was in fact not sealed correctly, as a more recent account stated the indication was false.

During this time Gagarin requested some music to be played over the radio. Korolev was reportedly suffering from chest pains and anxiety, as up to this point the Soviet space launch rate was 50% (12 out of 24 launches had failed). Two Vostoks had failed to reach orbit due to launch vehicle malfunctions and another two malfunctioned in orbit. Korolev was given a pill to calm him down. Gagarin, on the other hand, was described as calm; about half an hour before launch his pulse was recorded at 64 beats per minute.

=== Launch ===
Yuri Gagarin aboard Vostok 1, as televised to ground control

Poyekhali!
Gagarin's voice

- 06:07 UTC Launch occurred from the Baikonur Cosmodrome Site No.1. Korolev radioed, "Preliminary stage..... intermediate..... main..... lift off! We wish you a good flight. Everything is all right." Gagarin replied, "Let's go! (Poyekhali!)."
- 06:09 (T+ 119 s) The four strap-on boosters of the Vostok rocket used up the last of their propellant and dropped away from the core vehicle.
- 06:10 (T+ 156 s) The payload shroud covering Vostok 1 was released, uncovering a window at Gagarin's feet, with an optical orientation device Vzor (lit. "look" or "glance").
- 06:12 (T+ 300 s) The rocket core stage used up its propellant and fell away from the capsule and final rocket stage. The final rocket stage ignited.
- 06:13 Gagarin reported, "...the flight is continuing well. I can see the Earth. The visibility is good.... I almost see everything. There's a certain amount of space under cumulus cloud cover. I continue the flight, everything is good."
- 06:14 Vostok 1 passed over central Russia. Gagarin reported, "Everything is working very well. All systems are working. Let's keep going!"
- 06:15 Three minutes into the burn of the final rocket stage, Gagarin radioed, "Zarya-1, Zarya-1, I can't hear you very well. I feel fine. I'm in good spirits. I'm continuing the flight..." Vostok 1 started to move out of radio range of the Baikonur ground station.
- 06:17 The rocket final stage shut down and Vostok 1 reached orbit. Gagarin exclaimed "Kosberg has worked! (Kosberg Srabotal!)", Kosberg being the chief designer of the final rocket stage's engine. Ten seconds later the rocket separated from the capsule.

=== Time in orbit ===
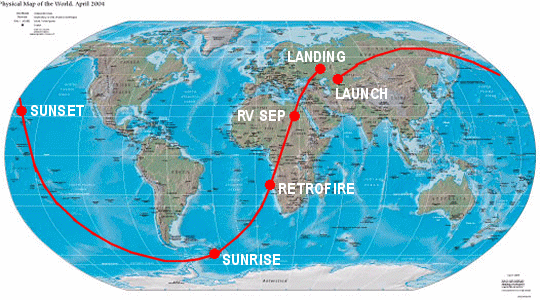
Ground trace of Gagarin's complete orbit; the landing point is west of the takeoff point because of the Earth's eastward rotation.

- 06:18 UTC (T+ 676 s) Gagarin reported, "The craft is operating normally. I can see Earth in the view port of the Vzor. Everything is proceeding as planned". Vostok 1 moved on over Siberia as it passed over the Soviet Union.
- 06:21 Vostok 1 passed over the Kamchatka Peninsula and out over the North Pacific Ocean. Gagarin radioed, "...the lights are on on the descent mode monitor. I'm feeling fine, and I'm in good spirits. Cockpit parameters: pressure 1; humidity 65; temperature 20; pressure in the compartment 1; first automatic 155; second automatic 155; pressure in the retro-rocket system 320 atmospheres...."
- 06:25 As Vostok 1 began its diagonal crossing of the Pacific Ocean from Kamchatka Peninsula to the southern tip of South America, Gagarin requested information about his orbital parameters: "What can you tell me about the flight? What can you tell me?". The ground station at Khabarovsk didn't have his orbital parameters yet, and reported back, "There are no instructions from No. 20 [code name for Korolyov], and the flight is proceeding normally." (Ground control did not know until 25 minutes after launch that a stable orbit had been achieved.)
- 06:31 Gagarin transmitted to the Khabarovsk ground station, "I feel splendid, very well, very well, very well. Give me some results on the flight!". At this time, Vostok 1 was nearing the VHF radio horizon for Khabarovsk, and they responded, "Repeat. I can't hear you very well". Gagarin transmitted again, "I feel very good. Give me your data on the flight!" Vostok 1 then passed out of VHF range of the Khabarovsk ground station.
- 06:37 Vostok 1 continued on its journey as the sun set over the North Pacific. Gagarin crossed into night, northwest of the Hawaiian Islands. Out of VHF range with ground stations, communications continued via HF radio.
- 06:46 Khabarovsk ground station sent the message "KK" via telegraph (on HF radio to Vostok 1). This was a code meaning, "Report the monitoring of commands," a request for Gagarin to report when the spacecraft automated descent system had received its instructions from ground control.
- 06:48 Vostok 1 crossed the equator at about 170° West in a southeast direction, and began crossing the South Pacific. Gagarin transmitted over HF radio, "I am transmitting the regular report message: 9 hours 48 minutes (Moscow Time), the flight is proceeding successfully. Spusk-1 is operating normally. The mobile index of the descent mode monitor is moving. Pressure in the cockpit is 1; humidity 65; temperature 20; pressure in the compartment 1.2 ... Manual 150; First automatic 155; second automatic 155; retro rocket system tanks 320 atmospheres. I feel fine...."
- 06:49 Gagarin reported he was on the night side of the Earth.
- 06:51 Gagarin reported the sun-seeking attitude control system was switched on; this oriented Vostok 1 for retrofire. The automatic/solar system was backed up by a manual/visual system; either one could operate the two redundant cold nitrogen gas thruster systems, each with 10 kg (22 lb) of gas.
- 06:53 The Khabarovsk ground station sent Gagarin via HF radio, "By order of No. 33 (General Nikolai Kamanin), the transmitters have been switched on, and we are transmitting this: the flight is proceeding as planned and the orbit is as calculated." Vostok 1 was now known to be in a stable orbit; Gagarin acknowledged.
- 06:57 Vostok 1 was over the South Pacific between New Zealand and Chile as Gagarin radioed, "...I'm continuing the flight, and I'm over America. I transmitted the telegraph signal "ON".
- 07:00 Vostok 1 crossed the Strait of Magellan at the tip of South America. News of the Vostok 1 mission was broadcast on Radio Moscow.
- 07:04 Gagarin sent another spacecraft status message, similar to the one at 06:48. This was not received by ground stations.
- 07:09 Gagarin sent another spacecraft status message, also not received by ground stations.
- 07:10 Vostok 1 passed over the South Atlantic, into daylight again. At this point, retrofire is 15 minutes away.
- 07:13 Gagarin sent a fourth spacecraft status message; Moscow received this partial message: "I read you well. The flight is going...."
- 07:18 Gagarin sent another spacecraft status message, not received by ground stations.
- 07:23 Gagarin sent another spacecraft status message, not received by ground stations.

The automatic orientation system brought Vostok 1 into alignment for retrofire about 1 hour into the flight.

== Reentry and landing ==
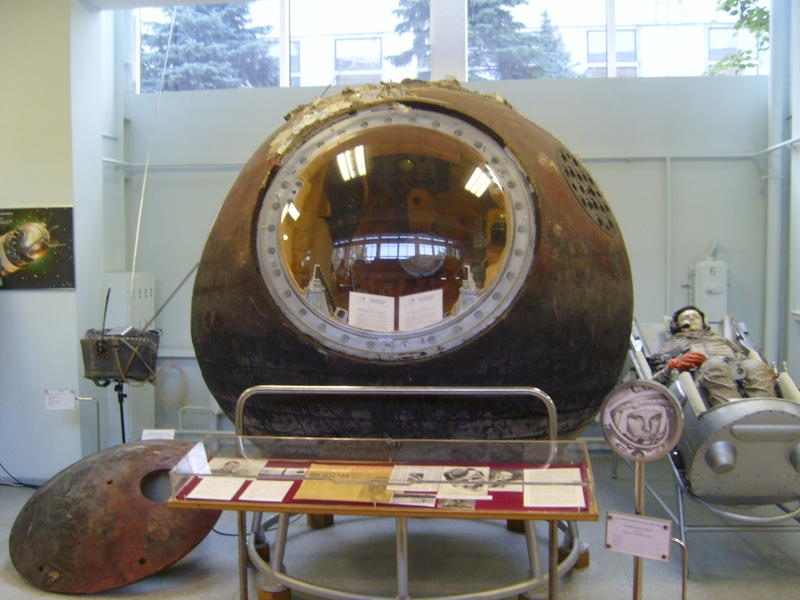
The Vostok 1 capsule at the RKK Energiya museum. The main capsule, seen in the center of this picture, earlier was displayed at the Space Pavilion at the VDNKh.

At 07:25 UTC, the spacecraft's automatic systems brought it into the required attitude (orientation) for the retrorocket firing, and shortly afterwards, the liquid-fueled engine fired for about 42 seconds over the west coast of Africa, near Angola, about 8,000 kilometers (5,000 miles; 4,300 nautical miles) uprange of the landing point. The orbit's perigee and apogee had been selected to cause reentry due to orbital decay within 13 days (the limit of the life support system function) in the event of retrorocket malfunction. However, the actual orbit differed from the planned and would not have allowed descent until 20 days.

Ten seconds after retrofire, commands were sent to separate the Vostok service module from the reentry module (code name "little ball" (Russian: шарик, romanized: sharik)), but the equipment module unexpectedly remained attached to the reentry module by a bundle of wires. At around 07:35 UTC, the two parts of the spacecraft began reentry and went through strong gyrations as Vostok 1 neared Egypt. At this point the wires broke, the two modules separated, and the descent module settled into the proper reentry attitude. Gagarin telegraphed "Everything is OK" despite continuing gyrations; he later reported that he did not want to "make noise" as he had (correctly) reasoned that the gyrations did not endanger the mission (and were apparently caused by the spherical shape of the reentry module). As Gagarin continued his descent, he remained conscious as he experienced about 8 g during reentry. (Gagarin's own report states "over 10 g".)

At 07:55 UTC, when Vostok 1 was still 7 km (23,000 ft) from the ground, the hatch of the spacecraft was released, and two seconds later Gagarin was ejected. At 2.5 km (8,200 ft) altitude, the main parachute was deployed from the Vostok spacecraft.

Gagarin's parachute opened almost immediately, and about ten minutes later, at 08:05 UTC, Gagarin landed. Both he and the spacecraft landed via parachute 26 km (16 mi; 14 nmi) south west of Engels, in the Saratov region at 51.270682°N 45.99727°E.

A kolkhoz woman Annihayat Nurskanova and her granddaughter, Rita, observed the strange scene of a figure in a bright orange suit with a large white helmet landing near them by parachute. Gagarin later recalled, "When they saw me in my space suit and the parachute dragging alongside as I walked, they started to back away in fear. I told them, don't be afraid, I am a Soviet citizen like you, who has descended from space and I must find a telephone to call Moscow!"

== Reactions and legacy ==
=== Soviet reaction ===
Gagarin's flight was announced while Gagarin was still in orbit, by Yuri Levitan, the leading Soviet radio personality since the 1930s. Although news of Soviet rocket launches would normally be aired only after the fact, Sergei Korolev wrote a note to the Party Central Committee to convince them that the announcement should be made as early as possible:

We consider it advisable to publish the first TASS report immediately after the satellite-spacecraft enters orbit, for the following reasons:

(a) if a rescue becomes necessary, it will facilitate rapid organization of a rescue;

(b) it precludes any foreign government declaring that the cosmonaut is a military scout.

The flight was celebrated as a great triumph of Soviet science and technology, demonstrating the superiority of the socialist system over capitalism. Moscow and other cities in the USSR held mass demonstrations, the scale of which was comparable to World War II Victory Parades. Gagarin was awarded the title of Hero of the Soviet Union, the nation's highest honour. He also became an international celebrity, receiving numerous awards and honours.

April 12 was declared Cosmonautics Day in the USSR, and is celebrated today in Russia as one of the official "Commemorative Dates of Russia". In 2011, it was declared the International Day of Human Space Flight by the United Nations.

Gagarin's informal reply Poyekhali! ("Let's go!") became a historical phrase used to refer to the arrival of the Space Age in human history. Later it was included in the refrain of the Soviet song "Do You Know What Kind of Guy He Was" ("Знаете, каким он парнем был") written by Alexandra Pakhmutova and Nikolai Dobronravov ("He said 'Let's go!' He waved his hand") which was dedicated to the memory of Gagarin.

=== American reaction ===
Officially, the U.S. congratulated the Soviet Union on its accomplishments. Writing for The New York Times shortly after the flight, however, journalist Arthur Krock described mixed feelings in the United States due to fears of the spaceflight's potential military implications for the Cold War, and the Detroit Free Press wrote that "the people of Washington, London, Paris and all points between might have been dancing in the streets" if it were not for "doubts and suspicions" about Soviet intentions. Other US writers were concerned that the spaceflight had gained a propaganda victory on behalf of communism. President John F. Kennedy was quoted as saying that it would be "some time" before the US could match the Soviet launch vehicle technology, and that "the news will be worse before it's better", Kennedy also sent congratulations to the Soviet Union for their "outstanding technical achievement". Opinion pages of many US newspapers urged renewed efforts to overtake the Soviet scientific accomplishments.

Adlai Stevenson, then the US ambassador to the United Nations, was quoted as saying, "Now that the Soviet scientists have put a man into space and brought him back alive, I hope they will also help to bring the United Nations back alive", and on a more serious note urged international agreements covering the use of space (which did not occur until the Outer Space Treaty of 1967).

Astronaut Alan Shepard, who was originally scheduled to become the first person in space but had his mission delayed six times due to preparatory work, was infuriated by the news and slammed his fist down on a table.

=== Other world reactions ===
Prime Minister Jawaharlal Nehru of India praised the Soviet Union for "a great victory of man over the forces of nature" and urged that it be "considered as a victory for peace". The Economist voiced worries that orbital platforms might be used for surprise nuclear attacks. The Svenska Dagbladet in Sweden chided "free countries" for "splitting up and frittering away" their resources, while West Germany's Die Welt argued that America had the resources to have sent a man into space first but was beaten by Soviet purposefulness. Japan's Yomiuri Shimbun urged "that both the United States and the Soviet Union should use their new knowledge and techniques for the good of mankind", and Egypt's Akhbar El Yom likewise expressed hopes that the cold war would "turn into a peaceful race in infinite space" and turn away from armed conflicts such as the Laotian Civil War.

Charles de Gaulle claimed that "the success of Soviet scientists and astronauts does honor to Europe and humanity". Sukarno, the President of the Republic of Indonesia, said that "that delightful event opens up new prospects for human thought and activity, which will be put at the service of the progress and well-being of people, international peace as a whole." Zhou Enlai, head of the State Council of the People's Republic of China, and Kim Il Sung, Chairman of the Cabinet of Ministers of the DPRK, described the successes of Soviet science as "a brilliant symbol of the triumph of socialism and communism". The chairman of the Council of Ministers of Cuba, Fidel Castro, sent a telegram to Khrushchev as follows: "Let this victory of his become the victory of all mankind, which men and women in all corners of the earth perceived as the greatest hope for the destinies of freedom, prosperity and peace."

The President of the Chinese Academy of Sciences, Guo Moruo, wrote a poem "歌颂东方号" ("Hymn to the Vostok Spacecraft"), which was published in Pravda. Charlie Chaplin and Gianni Rodari were among those who sent congratulatory telegrams to Komsomolskaya Pravda.

=== World records ===
FAI officially recognized three space records claimed by Gagarin: duration in orbital flight—108 minutes, greatest altitude in earth orbital flight—327 kilometres (203 mi; 177 nmi), greatest mass lifted in earth orbital flight—4,725 kilograms (10,417 lb).

The FAI rules in 1961 required that a pilot must land with the spacecraft to be considered an official spaceflight for the FAI record books. Although some contemporary Soviet sources stated that Gagarin had parachuted separately to the ground, the Soviet Union officially insisted that he had landed with the Vostok; the government forced the cosmonaut to lie in press conferences, and the FAI certified the flight. The Soviet Union did not admit until 1971 that Gagarin had ejected and landed separately from the Vostok descent module. Gagarin's spaceflight records were nonetheless certified and reaffirmed by the FAI, which revised its rules, and acknowledged that the crucial steps of the safe launch, orbit, and return of the pilot had been accomplished. Gagarin is internationally recognised as the first human in space and first to orbit the Earth.

=== Legacy ===
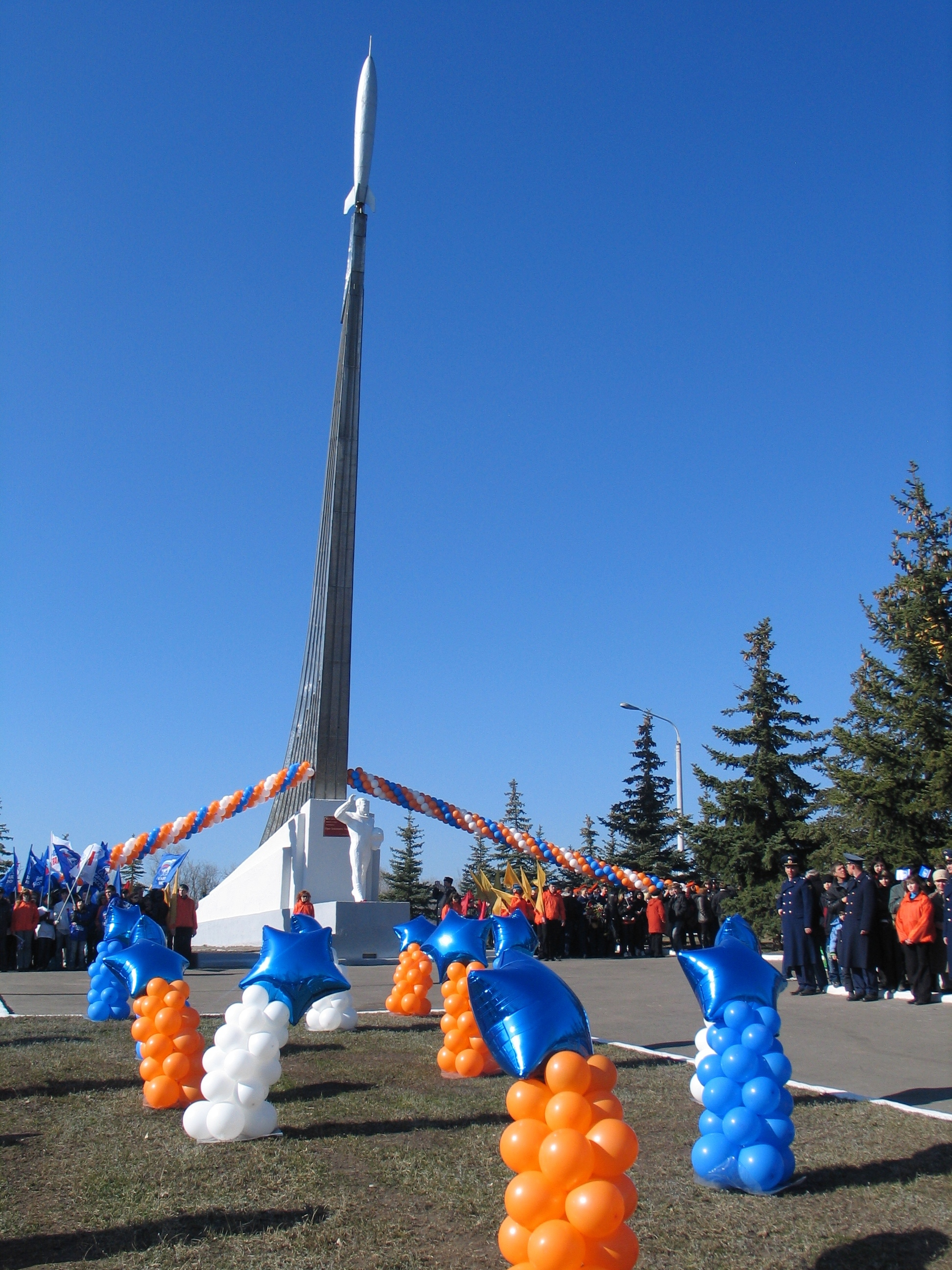
Commemorative monument, Vostok-1 landing site near Engels, Russia

Four decades after the flight, historian Asif S. Siddiqi wrote that Vostok 1

will undoubtedly remain one of the major milestones in not only the history of space exploration, but also the history of the human race itself. The fact that this accomplishment was successfully carried out by the Soviet Union, a country completely devastated by war just sixteen years prior, makes the achievement even more impressive. Unlike the United States, the USSR had to begin from a position of tremendous disadvantage. Its industrial infrastructure had been ruined, and its technological capabilities were outdated at best. A good portion of its land had been devastated by war, and it had lost about 25 million citizens ... but it was the totalitarian state that overwhelmingly took the lead [in the space race].

— Asif S. Siddiqi

The landing site is now a monument park. The central feature in the park is a 25 m (82 ft) tall monument that consists of a silver metallic rocketship rising on a curved metallic column of flame, from a wedge shaped, white stone base. In front of this is a 3-meter (9 foot) tall white stone statue of Yuri Gagarin, wearing a spacesuit, with one arm raised in greeting and the other holding a space helmet.

The Vostok 1 re-entry capsule belongs to the S. P. Korolev RSC Energia Museum in Korolev City. In 2018 it was temporarily loaned to the Space Pavilion at the VDNKh in Moscow.

In 2011, documentary film maker Christopher Riley partnered with European Space Agency astronaut Paolo Nespoli to record a new film of what Gagarin would have seen of the Earth from his spaceship, by matching historical audio recordings to video from the International Space Station following the ground path taken by Vostok 1. The resulting film, First Orbit, was released online to celebrate the 50th anniversary of human spaceflight.

== See also ==
- Vostok was the lead ship of Fabian Gottlieb von Bellingshausen, who discovered Antarctica during the Russian expedition to the south polar region in 1819–1820. Some sources connect the name Vostok 1 to Bellingshausen's ship.
