= In the Shadow of the Moon (2007 film) =

2007 British documentary film by David Sington

- Promotional film poster
- Directed by: David Sington
- Produced by: Duncan Copp; Christopher Riley
- Cinematography: Clive North
- Edited by: David Fairhead
- Music by: Philip Sheppard
- Production companies: Film4; Passion Pictures; Discovery Films
- Distributed by: Vertigo Films
- Release dates: 19 January 2007 (Sundance); 7 September 2007 (United States); 2 November 2007 (United Kingdom)
- Running time: 100 minutes
- Country: United Kingdom
- Language: English
- Box office: $2.1 million

In the Shadow of the Moon is a 2007 British documentary film about the United States' crewed missions to the Moon. After premiering at the 2007 Sundance Film Festival, where it won the World Cinema Audience Award, it was given a limited release in the United States on 7 September 2007, and in Canada on 19 October.

Although the film shares its name with a book by space historians Colin Burgess and Francis French that was also released in 2007, and both include many original interviews with Apollo lunar astronauts, neither work is a source of, or a tie-in to, the other.

== Synopsis ==
The film tells the story of NASA's crewed moon missions in the late 1960s and early 1970s as part of the Apollo program, with particular focus given to Apollo 11. The ten Apollo astronauts interviewed by the filmmakers tell their story, supplemented by mission footage shot by the astronauts, archival footage, and news reports about the Apollo program by the likes of television broadcasters Walter Cronkite and Jules Bergman, and the occasional use of onscreen text.

== Participants ==
Ten of the twenty-four men who reached the vicinity of the Moon as part of the Apollo program were interviewed for the film. Those ten represent every crewed Apollo flight, with the exception of Apollo 7 (which was an Earth-orbit mission), and include eight of the twelve men who set foot on the lunar surface. Some astronauts had already died by the time the film was made, and Neil Armstrong chose not to participate in the film. The other two astronauts featured in the film, Jim Lovell and Michael Collins, orbited the Moon, but did not land on it. The interviewees are:

- Apollo 11:
  - Buzz Aldrin, Lunar Module Pilot
  - Michael Collins, Command Module Pilot
- Apollo 12:
  - Alan Bean, Lunar Module Pilot
- Apollo 13:
  - Jim Lovell, Commander (also Apollo 8 Command Module Pilot)
- Apollo 14:
  - Edgar Mitchell, Lunar Module Pilot
- Apollo 15:
  - David Scott, Commander (also Apollo 9 Command Module Pilot)
- Apollo 16:
  - John Young, Commander (also Apollo 10 Command Module Pilot)
  - Charles Duke, Lunar Module Pilot (also Apollo 11 Capsule Communicator)
- Apollo 17:
  - Eugene Cernan, Commander (also Apollo 10 Lunar Module Pilot)
  - Harrison Schmitt, Lunar Module Pilot

== Production ==
The film features footage and media that had been released to the public at the time of the missions, and films and materials from NASA that had not been opened in over 30 years, all of which was sourced and remastered in HD by the stock footage company Footagevault.

Ron Howard, who is credited as presenting the film, was involved in its promotion, but not its production.

== Reception ==
Critics gave the film very positive reviews. On review aggregator website Rotten Tomatoes, it has an approval rating of 95% based on 113 reviews, with an average score of 7.90 out of 10. On Metacritic, it has a weighted average score of 84 out of 100, based on reviews from 34 critics, indicating "universal acclaim".

Roger Ebert called the film "spellbinding". Entertainment Weekly gave it an "A" rating. The Los Angeles Times called the film a "fresh and compelling film, made with intelligence and emotion". The Hollywood Reporter concluded that "The value of this film, not just to moviegoers today but to future generations, is simply enormous."

In March 2008, In the Shadow of the Moon was the first film to win the Sir Arthur Clarke Award for Best Film Presentation. On 23 June 2008, the Independent Investigations Group (IIG) honoured the film for promoting scientific skepticism in media; the award was accepted by producer Duncan Copp.

== Home video ==
The film was released on DVD in the United States on 22 February 2008, and in the United Kingdom on 31 March. A Blu-ray edition of the film was released on 16 June 2009.

== See also ==
- Apollo 11 in popular culture
