= Theo Kamecke =

American sculptor and film director

- Theo filming Moonwalk One (1969).
- Born: 18 October 1937; New York City, New York, U.S.
- Died: 23 May 2017 (aged 79); Catskill Mountains, New York, U.S.
- Occupations: Film Editor, director, screenwriter and sculptor
- Children: 1 son
- Website: theokamecke.com

Theo Kamecke (October 18, 1937 – May 23, 2017) was an American sculptor, who had previously worked as a film director during the 1960s and 1970s. Kamecke's best known film is Moonwalk One - a NASA commissioned documentary feature film to cover their Apollo 11 mission in the summer of 1969. Theo's other influential films included The Incredible Bread Machine Film, and To Be Alive, which he worked as a film editor on. Since the 1980s, Theo has worked as a sculptor, working in the medium of early electronic circuits. His work has been purchased by film director James Cameron. Kamecke died on May 23, 2017, at the age of 79.

== Early years ==
Kamecke lived for several years in Kansas, before his family relocated to the Boston area. He attended Tufts University, leaving after his second year because he felt the urge to hitch-hike around the country and discover life. Following this first road trip he settled in California and lived around Los Angeles for a couple of years before returning to Boston where he found work with a publisher near Harvard Square. This vocation held little interest for him however, and he had by now decided that he wanted to make films. So in 1962 he came to New York City which was then the center for non-theatrical film production.

== Film career ==
Kamecke’s experience in the film world began only shortly before joining Francis Thompson and Alexander Hammid in New York City, to edit the multi-screen film To Be Alive! which became the hit of the 1964-65 New York World’s Fair, and won the Academy Award for best short documentary. After editing another Francis Thompson multi-screen film for Expo 67 in Montreal, Kamecke set off on his own to direct other creative documentaries.

In 1969 he was called back by Francis Thompson to take on the feature-length documentary for NASA about the Apollo 11 landing on the Moon, which came to be called Moonwalk One. That film was shown at Cannes and was subsequently in the first program of New American Directors at the Whitney Museum of American Art in New York City.

In the years that followed, Theo Kamecke wrote, directed and filmed many documentary short films on subjects as varied as computers, coal mines and cowboys. He created a film projection for Jesus Christ Superstar, an award-winning, three-minute-long television commercial for IBM, and the first program for the children’s television series Big Blue Marble. Among his short films was the avant-garde and controversial The Incredible Bread Machine Film, for the World Research think tank in California (1974).

His films had taken him to many parts of the world but by the 1980s he was growing weary of a life revolving around schedules and meetings, and craved creativity on his own schedule.

== Sculpture ==
While still keeping an apartment in New York City, in the 1970s Kamecke bought a home in a rural area in the northern Catskill Mountains. It became the depository for various things of visual interest which he had collected while making films. One day in the mid-80’s when an impulse to be creative struck, he looked at a pile of circuit-boards he had collected because of their graphic qualities, and began to build something. His first shows in New York City came a couple of years later. Kamecke's website displays images and a more detailed description of his artwork.

Theo Kamecke’s circuitry sculpture is held in private, institutional and museum collections internationally.

== Awards and nominations ==
1972 Cannes Prix Special, for Moonwalk One

== Filmography ==
- 1964 To be Alive!, Film Editor
- 1970 Moonwalk One, Film Director, Writer, Editor
- 1974 The Incredible Bread Machine Film, Film Director and Cameraman
- 1983 The Future Below
- 1983 The Microwave Question
- 1986 Teterboro: Memories of an Airport
