= National Astronaut Day =

- Observed by: United States
- Type: Secular
- Significance: Commemorates the first US human spaceflight in 1961
- Date: 5 December
- Frequency: annual

National Astronaut Day is an American commemorative day, founded by and a registered trademark of uniphigood, LLC, held on May 5 since 2016. It commemorates the first United States human spaceflight, on May 5, 1961, piloted by astronaut Alan Shepard.

== See also ==
- International Day of Human Space Flight
- Astronauts Day
- Cosmonautics Day
- Yuri's Night
