= International Day of Human Space Flight =

Observance on 12 April

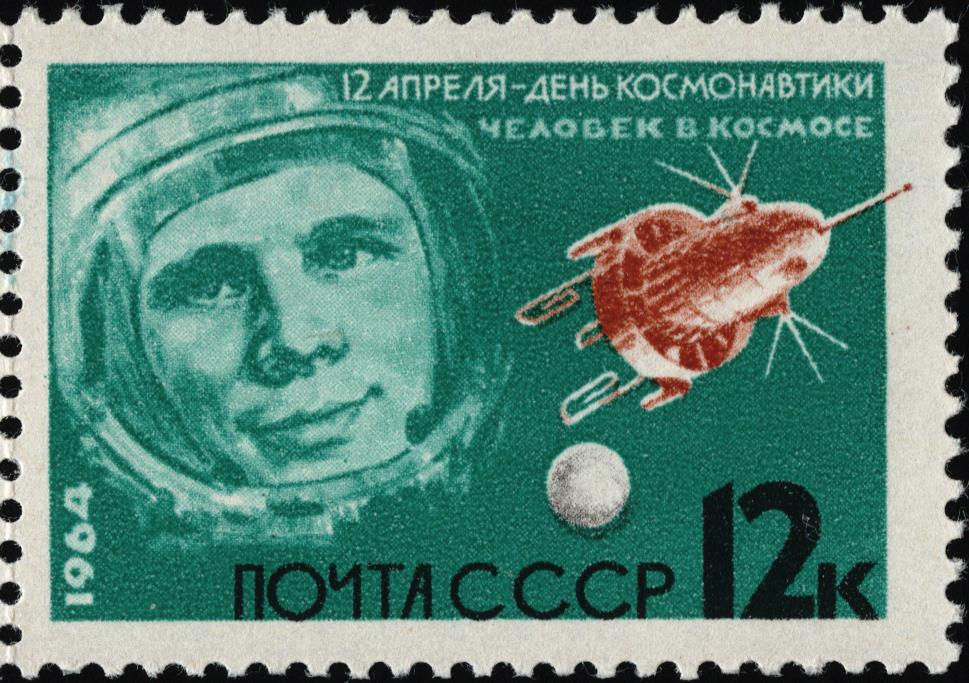
USSR stamp, 1964

The International Day of Human Space Flight is the annual celebration, held on 12 April, of the anniversary of the first human space flight by Yuri Gagarin (USSR). It was proclaimed at the 65th session of the United Nations General Assembly on 7 April 2011, a few days before the 50th anniversary of the flight.

Yuri Gagarin crewed the Vostok 1 mission in 1961, completing one orbit around Earth over 108 minutes in the Vostok 3KA spacecraft, launched on a Vostok-K rocket from Baikonur Cosmodrome in Kazakhstan, USSR.

In the Soviet Union, 12 April was commemorated as Cosmonautics Day since 1963, and is still observed in Russia and some former Soviet states. Yuri's Night, also known as "World Space Party", is an international observance initiated in the United States in 2001, on the 40th anniversary of Gagarin's flight.

Also commemorated on this date is the first Space Shuttle launch, STS-1 of Columbia on 12 April 1981, exactly 20 years after the first human spaceflight.

== See also ==
- Astronauts Day
- Cosmonautics Day
- National Astronaut Day
- Asteroid Day
- Astronomy Day
- World Space Week
