= What's Going On up There? =

What's going on up there?
- Directed by: Maryanne Galvin
- Written by: Maryanne Galvin
- Produced by: Maryanne Galvin
- Narrated by: Leonard Nimoy
- Distributed by: Forward In Time
- Release date: 2006
- Running time: 60 minutes
- Countries: United States, Japan
- Language: English

What's going on up there? is a one-hour documentary film by Maryanne Galvin that explores the topic of why space and space exploration is important from a number of perspectives, by considering the question "What's going on up there?" Featuring a voice introduction by Leonard Nimoy and interviews with scientists and scholars at MIT, Yale, Sydney University, and UC San Francisco, attorneys, authors, entrepreneurs, economist, environmentalists, filmmakers, youngsters and average citizens—even a college student in Kuwait who wants to be the first Muslim woman in space—the documentary offers conversations on all sides of the space debate.

== Awards and festival screenings ==
In competition at:

- the Beverly Hills HD Film Festival on December 31, 2006, LA, California;
- San Diego International Children's Film Festival, April 22, 2007 Balboa Park
- The Delray Beach Film Festival, March 17, 2007
- DC Independent Film Festival, Washington DC, March 5, 2007
- Yuri's Night April 13, 2007 at NASA-Ames, Mountain View, California
- IndieCan Film Festival, Toronto Canada May 10–12, 2007
