= Loretta Hidalgo Whitesides =

American public speaker

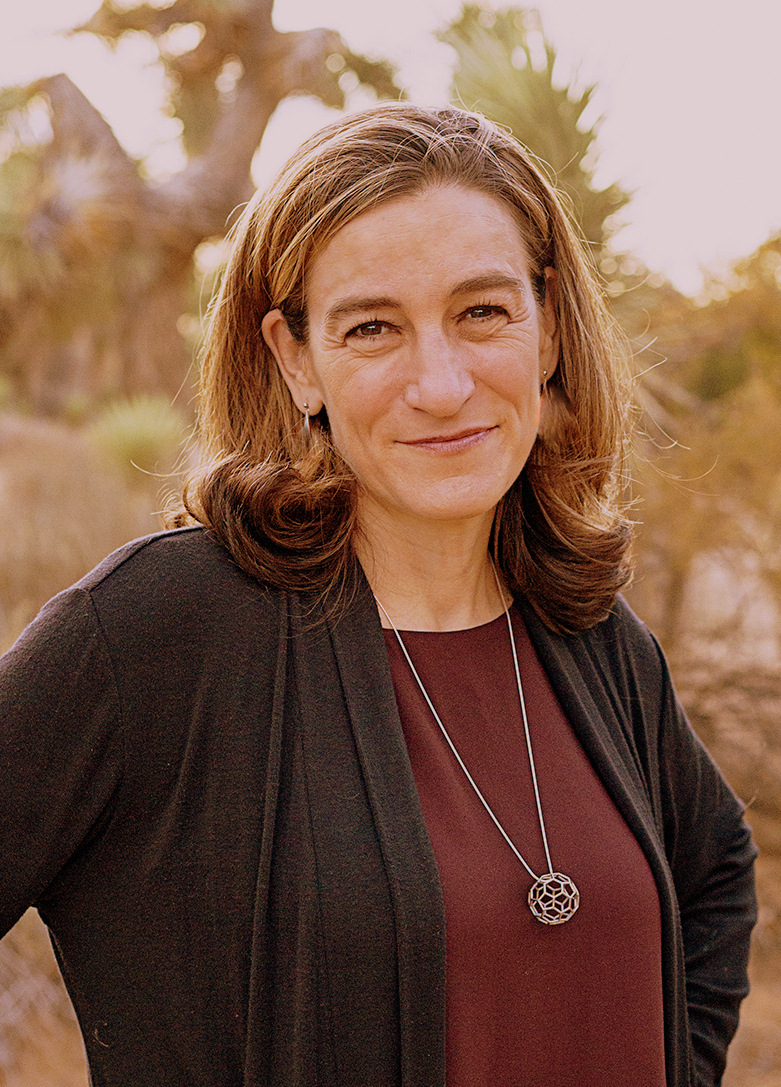
- Education: Stanford University; California Institute of Technology; International Space University
- Known for: Space flight
- Spouse: George T. Whitesides
- Children: 2
- Website: www.lorettawhitesides.com

Loretta Hidalgo Whitesides is an American public speaker, co-creator of Yuri's Night, and an author on space exploration. She accumulated over five hours of weightless time as a Flight Director for Zero-G Corporation, and plans to travel to space as a "Founder Astronaut" on Virgin Galactic's SpaceShipTwo. She is married to George T. Whitesides, Congressman from California who was elected in 2024.

Whitesides received a bachelor's degree in biology from Stanford and a master's from Caltech, where she showed an interest in astrobiology. She appeared in the 3D IMAX documentary "Aliens of the Deep" alongside director James Cameron traveling to hydrothermal vents two miles under the ocean. She has also visited Haughton impact crater in the arctic to study plants surviving in extreme environments. In addition, she has given numerous TEDx talks about space exploration and personal development.

== Publications ==
- Whitesides, Loretta Hidalgo (Sep 13, 2018). The New Right Stuff: Using Space to Bring Out the Best in You. Independently published. p. 201. ISBN 978-1720273639.
- Cockell, Charles S, Pascal Lee, Andrew C Schuerger, Loretta Hidalgo, Jeff A Jones, and M Dale Stokes. 2001. "Microbiology and Vegetation of Micro-Oases and Polar Desert, Haughton Impact Crater, Devon Island, Nunavut, Canada". Arctic, Antarctic, and Alpine Research. 33, no. 3: 306.
- Whitesides, L. (2008, January 31). Space, The Final Frontier for Homosexuality.
