= Astronauts Day =

American holiday

- Observed by: United States
- Type: Day of remembrance of NASA astronauts
- Date: Last Friday in January
- 2024 date: January 26
- 2025 date: January 31
- 2026 date: January 30
- 2027 date: January 29

Astronauts Day is an American holiday, dedicated to NASA astronauts and their achievements. It is a "floating" holiday, observed on the last Friday of January.

== Overview ==
This date was chosen to commemorate a number of space-related disasters which took place around this time, including the 27 January 1967 deaths of Command Pilot Virgil Grissom, Senior Pilot Edward Higgins White, and Pilot Roger Chaffee aboard Apollo 1, and disasters involving the Space Shuttle Challenger on 28 January 1986, and the Space Shuttle Columbia on 1 February 2003.

Observants of this holiday are asked to light a candle in their window, reflect on the sacrifices astronauts have made, and re-dedicate themselves to a personal dream or goal of their own, a reference to a quote from Alan Shepard. While stuck in his suit for hours during a space mission, enduring technical delays, his patience gave out and he said "Why don’t you fix your little problem and light this candle!"

== See also ==
- Cosmonautics Day (Russia and some former USSR countries)
- National Astronaut Day (USA)
- Yuri's Night
