= George T. Whitesides =

American businessman and politician (born 1974)

George Whitesides
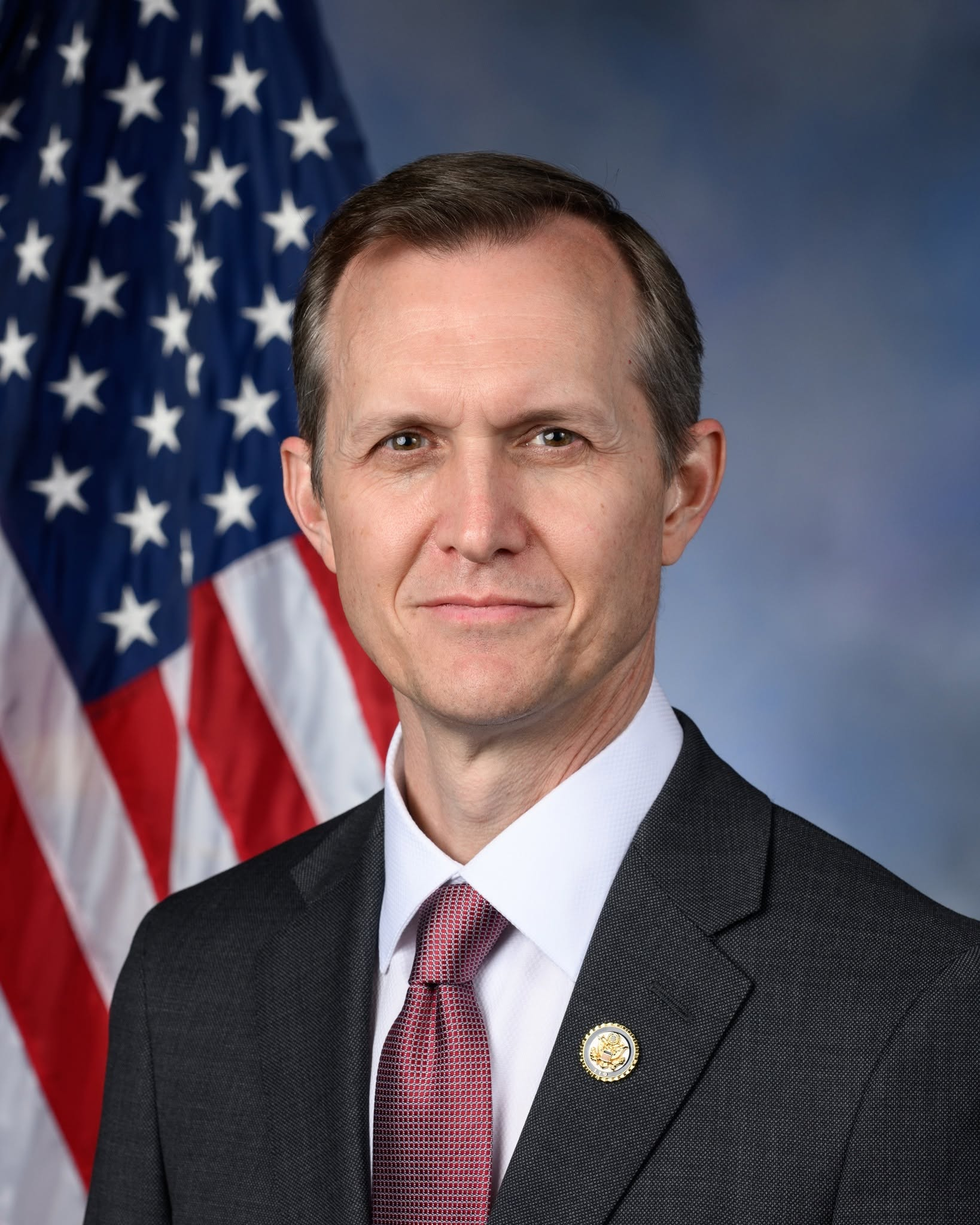
- Official portrait, 2025

Member of the U.S. House of Representatives from California's 27th district
- Incumbent
- Assumed office January 3, 2025
- Preceded by: Mike Garcia

Personal details
- Born: George Thomas Whitesides; March 3, 1974 (age 52) Massachusetts, U.S.
- Party: Democratic
- Spouse: Loretta Hidalgo
- Children: 2
- Relatives: George M. Whitesides (father); James Breasted (great-grandfather)
- Education: Princeton University (BA); King's College, Cambridge (MPhil)
- Awards: NASA Distinguished Service Medal (2010)
- Website: House website Campaign website

George Thomas Whitesides (born March 3, 1974) is an American politician and businessman who has served as the U.S. representative for California's 27th congressional district since 2025. He was previously chief of staff at NASA and CEO of Virgin Galactic. He is a member of the Democratic Party.

Whitesides' district covers northern Los Angeles County, and includes Santa Clarita, Palmdale, Lancaster, and parts of the northwestern San Fernando Valley.

== Early life and education ==
Whitesides was born on March 3, 1974, in Massachusetts. He was raised in Newton with his brother. His great-grandfather, James Breasted, was an egyptologist who coined the term "fertile crescent". While growing up, Whitesides played ice hockey and attended Newton North High School, where he graduated in 1992.

Whitesides went on to attend Princeton University, where he studied at the Woodrow Wilson School of Public and International Affairs, earning his bachelor's degree in 1996. After graduating, he served for four years on Princeton's Board of Trustees. He later earned an MPhil in geographic information systems and remote sensing from King's College, Cambridge, and was a Fulbright Scholar in Tunisia.

== Space career ==
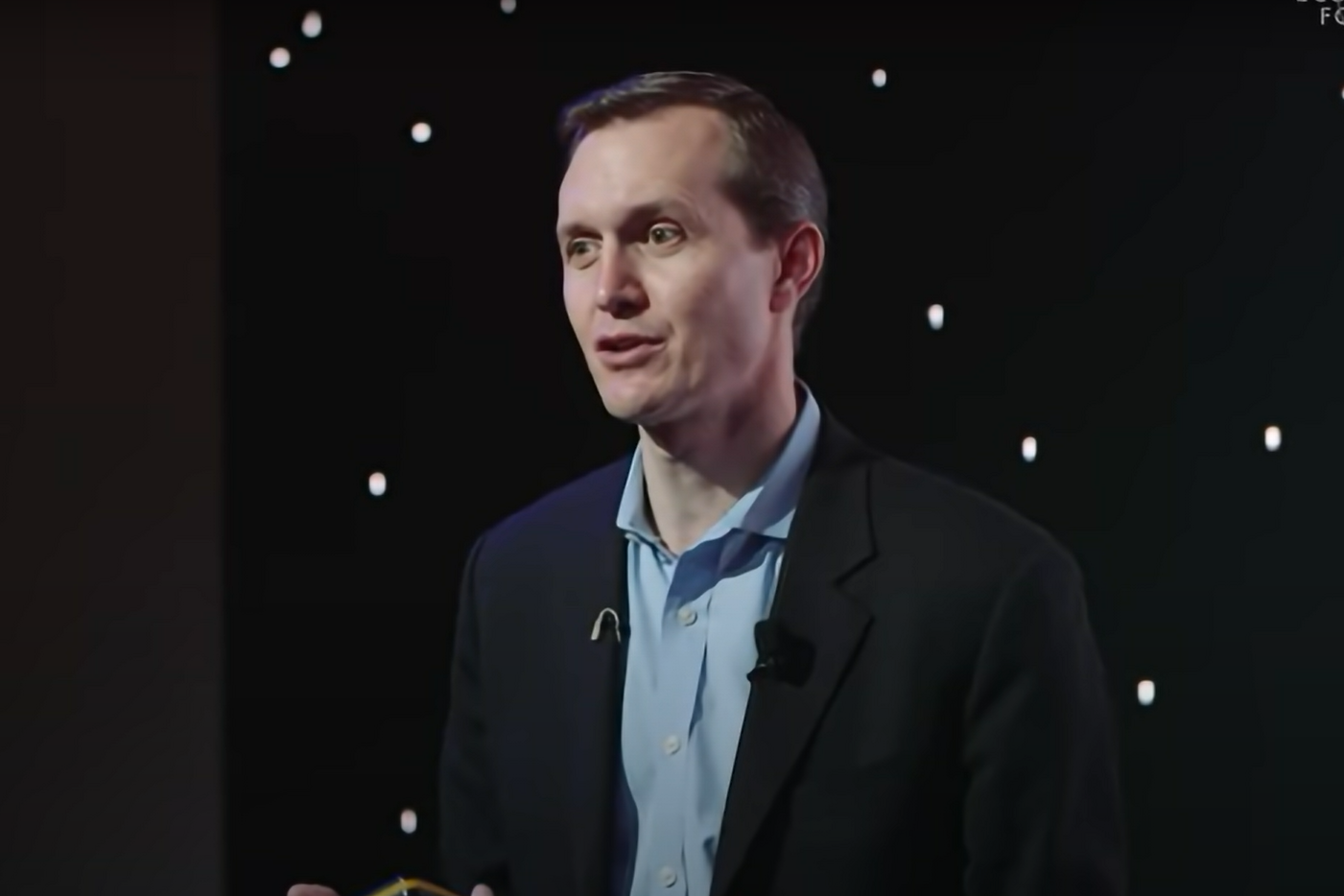
Whitesides speaking at the World Economic Forum, 2017

Whitesides began his career in the space sector, where he served as executive director of the National Space Society from 2004 to 2008. He also co-founded Yuri's Night, an annual celebration of human spaceflight, alongside his wife Loretta Hidalgo Whitesides. During this period, he was named senior advisor to Virgin Galactic, Richard Branson's space tourism company.

Whitesides worked on the 2008 presidential transition of Barack Obama. After Obama took office, he was appointed chief of staff of NASA, where he served until 2010 under Administrator Charles Bolden. Upon his departure, he was awarded the NASA Distinguished Service Medal, the agency's highest award.

After leaving NASA, Whitesides became Virgin Galactic's first CEO and led the company for a decade. He oversaw the development of commercial spaceflight vehicles and managed operations at the Mojave Air and Space Port. During this time, he also chaired the Reusable Launch Vehicle Working Group for COMSTAC, the advisory committee for the FAA's Commercial Space Transportation Division. Additionally, he served as a board member for Astronomers Without Borders and the Space Generation Foundation. He announced in 2021 his departure as CEO of Virgin Galactic while remaining in an advisory role with the company.

In December 2022, Whitesides co-sponsored a research parabolic flight with AstroAccess.

== U.S. House of Representatives ==
=== Elections ===
==== 2024 ====
California's 27th district since 2023

On February 22, 2023, Whitesides announced he was running for California's 27th congressional district in the 2024 election as a Democrat, challenging incumbent Republican congressman Mike Garcia. As a first-time candidate without a legislative voting record, Republican opposition focused on the progressive groups and candidates that contributed to his campaign, including Equality California, which co-sponsored the controversial 2020 California Senate Bill 145 regarding judicial discretion in sex offender registration.

Whitesides narrowly defeated Garcia in the general election on November 5, 2024, by around 8,000 votes.

==== 2026 ====
Under Proposition 50, registered Democrats in the district increased by 2% and Republicans decreased by 3% with the new district boundaries for the 27th district. Whitesides is seeking a second term against Republican nominee Jason Gibbs.

=== Tenure ===
Whitesides was sworn into office on January 3, 2025. During his first term, he was appointed to the House Armed Services Committee and the Science, Space, and Technology Committee. In March 2025, he co-sponsored the bipartisan DOE and NASA Interagency Research Coordination Act, a bill introduced by Nick Begich (R-AK), which passed the House and formalized collaboration between the Department of Energy and NASA to advance space exploration and energy innovation.

During his first week in office, Whitesides returned to Los Angeles to assist with wildfire response efforts, helping coordinate on-the-ground outreach following the Hurst Fire. In response to the broader 2025 Southern California wildfires, Whitesides – who had co-founded a wildfire prevention organization and emphasized urban wildfire risks during his campaign – co-sponsored the bipartisan Fix Our Forests Act, which passed the House and aimed to improve forest management by easing environmental regulations and improving coordination of science-based fire prevention efforts across government agencies.

=== Committee assignments ===
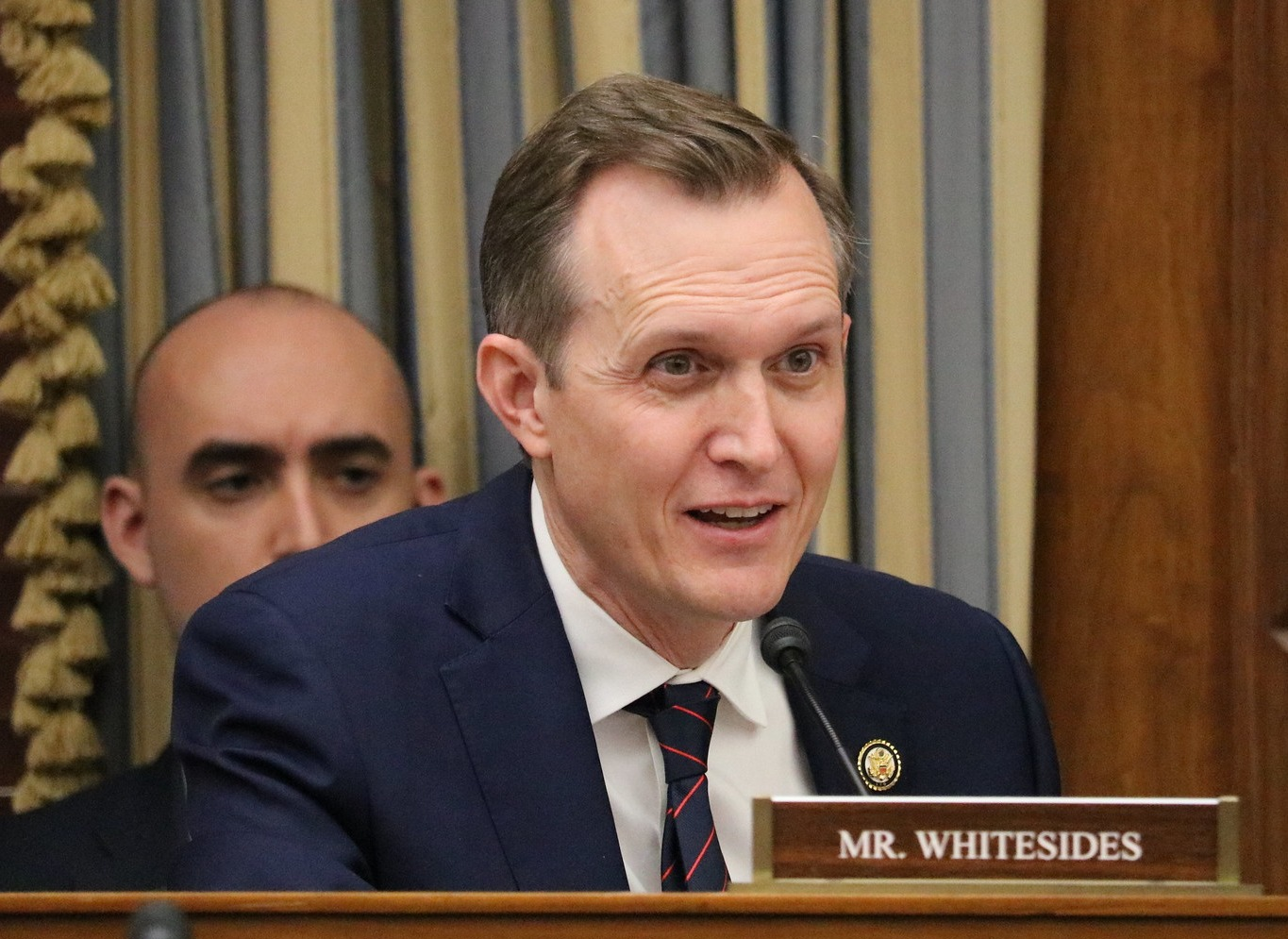
Whitesides on the Science, Space, and Technology Committee, 2025

Whitesides's committee assignments for the 119th Congress:

- Committee on Armed Services
  - Subcommittee on Cyber, Information Technologies, and Innovation
  - Subcommittee on Seapower and Projection Forces
  - Subcommittee on Strategic Forces
- Committee on Science, Space, and Technology (vice-ranking member)
  - Subcommittee on Space and Aeronautics

=== Caucus memberships ===
Whitesides's caucus memberships include:

- Congressional Equality Caucus
- New Democrat Coalition
- Future Forum

== Political positions ==
=== Artificial intelligence ===
In September 2026, Whitesides helped to co-lead a letter that was joined by 107 other House Democrats, urging Speaker Mike Johnson to cancel the chamber's fall recess and remain in session until Congress passed safeguards against what the letter described as catastrophic risks from advanced artificial intelligence. He called for a one month long "safety stand-down" during which AI companies would pause research on frontier models while key stakeholders agreed on limits that Congress could then write into law. He has also introduced a bill to study the effects of AI on classrooms and student learning.

=== Immigration ===
Whitesides has called ICE "an agency that is in dire need of oversight" and has criticized ICE agent behavior during the second Trump administration. He supports border security and does not favor abolishing the agency.

=== Foreign policy ===
Whitesides voted in June 2026 for a War Powers Resolution directing the president to withdraw U.S. forces from the War in Iran, which passed the House. He has said the war should end, citing its effect on fuel prices and the cost of goods.

=== Trade ===
Whitesides has opposed the tariffs imposed during the second Trump administration, saying they raise input costs for manufacturers in his district, and he has also specifically said that the trade dispute with Canada needs to end.

=== Wildfires and disaster relief ===
Whitesides has described wildfire as an existential threat to Southern California. He supports consolidating federal firefighting operations and raising pay for federal wildland firefighters. In 2026, Whitesides criticized the delay in federal wildfire relief for Los Angeles County, which had waited over 20 months for supplemental appropriation legislation that would release federal funds to support California's rebuilding efforts.

== Personal life ==
Whitesides is married to Loretta Hidalgo Whitesides, with whom he has two children. He is Episcopalian.

== Electoral history ==
2024 U.S. House of Representatives election, California's 27th district
Primary election
Party	Candidate	Votes	%
Republican	Mike Garcia (incumbent)	74,245	54.93
Democratic	George Whitesides	44,391	32.84
Democratic	Steve Hill	16,525	12.23
Total votes		135,161	100
General election
Democratic	George Whitesides	154,040	51.33
Republican	Mike Garcia (incumbent)	146,050	48.67
Total votes		300,090	100
Democratic gain from Republican			

2026 U.S. House of Representatives election, California's 27th district
Primary election
Party	Candidate	Votes	%
Republican	Jason Gibbs	62,758	40.98
Democratic	George Whitesides (incumbent)	62,214	40.63
Democratic	Roberto Ramos	14,868	9.71
Democratic	Caleb Norwood	13,293	8.68
Total votes		153,133	100

U.S. House of Representatives
Preceded by Mike Garcia	Member of the U.S. House of Representatives from California's 27th congressional district 2025–present	Incumbent
U.S. order of precedence (ceremonial)
Preceded by Eugene Vindman	United States representatives by seniority 422nd	Succeeded by Randy Fine
