= Mercury-Redstone 3 =

First United States human spaceflight (1961)

Freedom 7
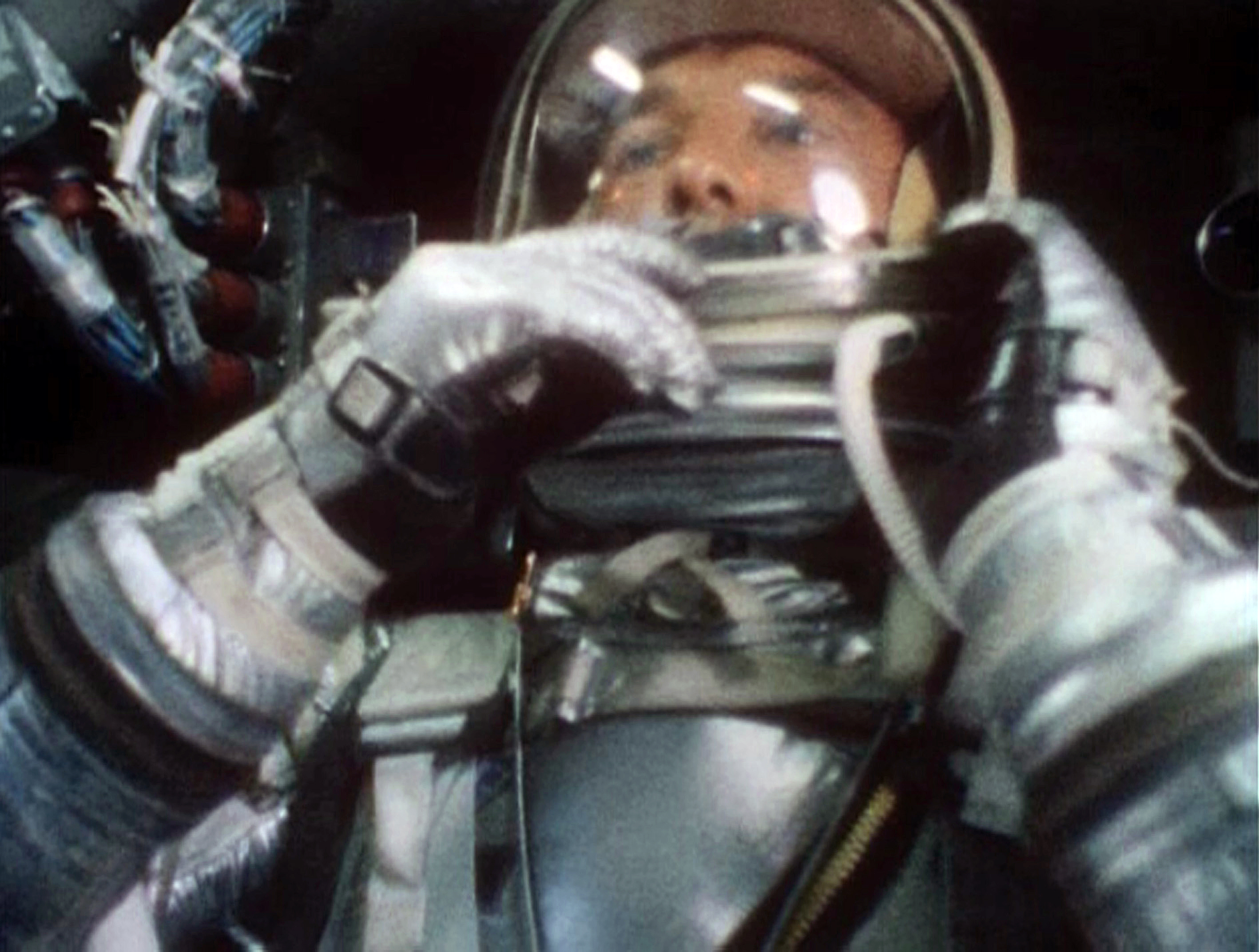
- Still frame of Alan Shepard taken by a motion picture camera aboard Freedom 7 during splashdown
- Mission type: Test flight
- Operator: NASA
- Mission duration: 15 minutes, 28 seconds
- Range: 263.1 nautical miles (302.8 statute miles, 487.3 km)
- Apogee: 101.2 nautical miles (116.5 statute miles, 187.5 km)

Spacecraft properties
- Spacecraft: Mercury No.7
- Manufacturer: McDonnell Aircraft
- Launch mass: 4,040 pounds (1,830 kg)
- Landing mass: 2,316 pounds (1,051 kg)

Crew
- Crew size: 1
- Members: Alan Shepard
- Callsign: Freedom 7

Start of mission
- Launch date: May 5, 1961, 14:34:13 UTC
- Rocket: Redstone MRLV MR-7
- Launch site: Cape Canaveral LC-5

End of mission
- Recovered by: USS Lake Champlain
- Landing date: May 5, 1961, 14:49:35 UTC
- Landing site: North Atlantic Ocean; 27.23°N 75.88°W
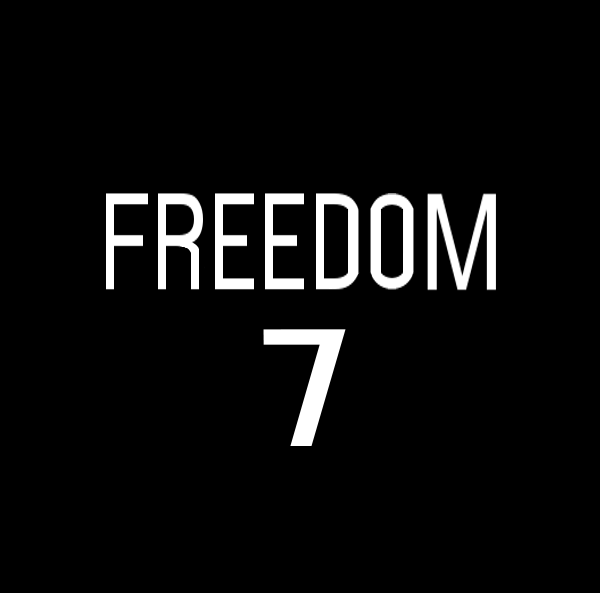
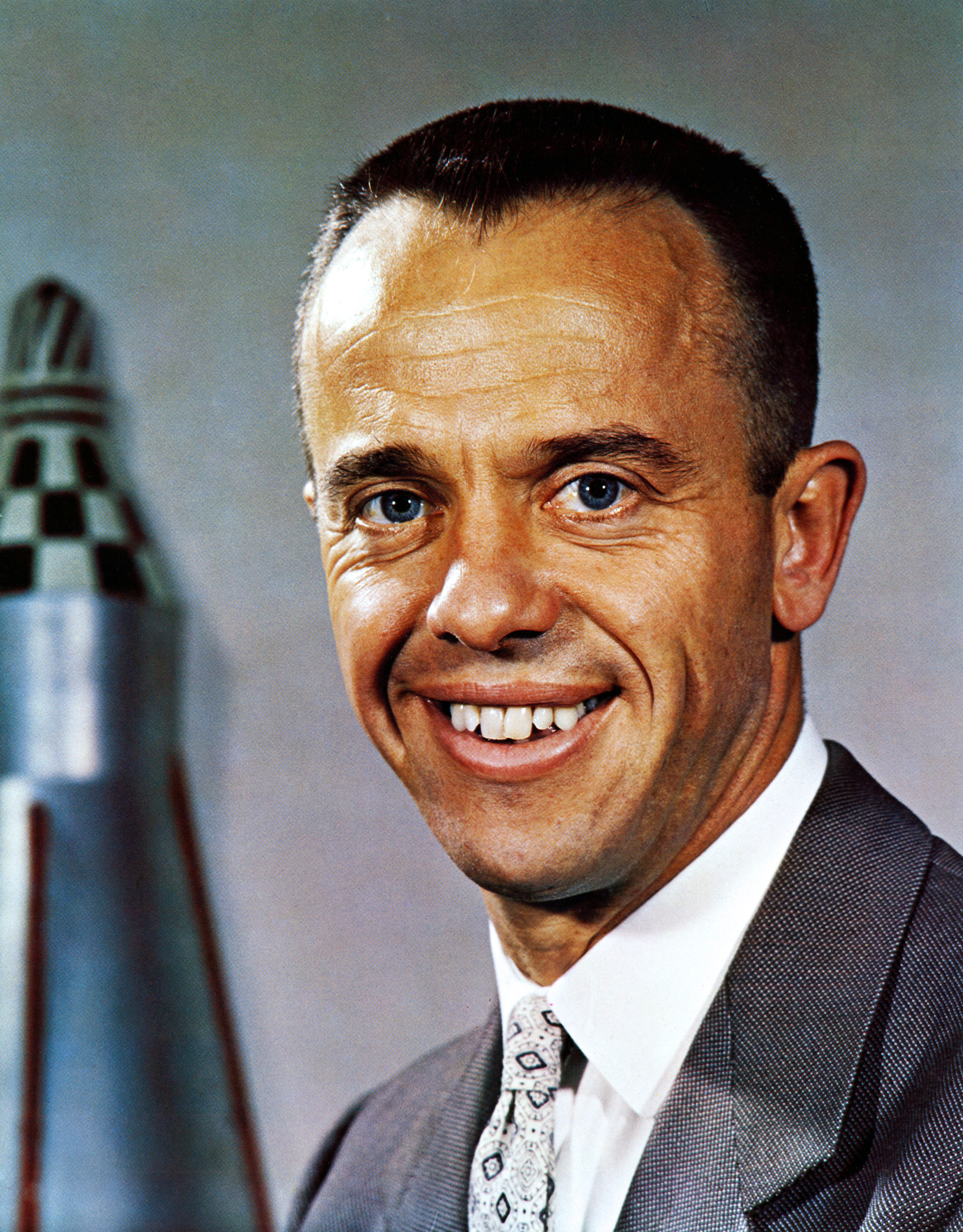
- Spacecraft name as painted on the capsule side Alan Bartlett Shepard, Jr. Project Mercury; Crewed missions

Mercury-Redstone 3, or Freedom 7, was the first United States human spaceflight, on May 5, 1961, piloted by astronaut Alan Shepard. It was the first crewed flight of Project Mercury. The project had the ultimate objective of putting an astronaut into orbit around the Earth and returning him safely. Shepard's mission was a 15-minute suborbital flight with the primary objective of demonstrating his ability to withstand the high g-forces of launch and atmospheric re-entry.

Shepard named his space capsule Freedom 7, setting a precedent for the remaining six Mercury astronauts naming their spacecraft and the format of their names. They selected names ending with a "7" in all the crewed Mercury spacecraft to commemorate the NASA's first group of seven astronauts.; the number 7 also was the model number for the McDonnell Model #7 space capsule used in the Mercury Program. His spacecraft reached an altitude of 101.2 nautical miles (116.5 statute miles, 187.5 km) and traveled a downrange distance of 263.1 nautical miles (302.8 statute miles, 487.3 km). It was the fourth Mercury flight launched with the Mercury-Redstone Launch Vehicle, (Note: The previous three Mercury-Redstone flights were the uncrewed Mercury-Redstone 1A, Mercury-Redstone 2 (which carried a chimpanzee), and Mercury-Redstone BD, an uncrewed flight with a "boilerplate" (non-production) Mercury capsule.) from Cape Canaveral, Florida, close to the Atlantic Ocean.

During the flight, Shepard observed the Earth and tested the capsule's attitude control system, turning the capsule around to face its blunt heat shield forward for atmospheric re-entry. He also tested the retrorockets which would return later missions from orbit, though the capsule did not have enough energy to remain in orbit. After re-entry, the capsule landed by parachute on the North Atlantic Ocean off the Bahamas. Shepard and the capsule were picked up by helicopter and brought to U.S. Navy aircraft carrier USS Lake Champlain.

The mission was a technical success, though American pride in the accomplishment was dampened by the fact that just three weeks before, the Soviet Union had launched the first human in space, Yuri Gagarin, who completed one orbit on Vostok 1. In 2017 the first National Astronaut Day was held on May 5 to pay tribute to this first U.S. flight.

== Preparation ==
The spacecraft for MR-3, Mercury capsule #7, was delivered to Cape Canaveral on December 9, 1960. It had originally been expected that a mission could be launched soon after the spacecraft was available, but Capsule #7 turned out to require extensive development and testing work before it was deemed safe for flight. However, as it had been earmarked since the summer as the first crewed spacecraft, the decision was taken to delay the mission until this particular capsule was ready, with a tentative launch date of March 6, rather than use an alternative capsule. The booster originally intended for the flight, Redstone #3, had been delivered to the Cape in early December; however, it was then used on the MR-1A test flight on December 19. The replacement, Redstone #7, did not arrive at the Cape until late March; by this time, however, the mission had already been postponed to await the results of another test flight.

In late 1960, there had been a growing number of concerns about the safety of the Redstone launch vehicle; the MR-2 test flight, carrying Ham the chimpanzee, had experienced technical problems during the launch, leading to the spacecraft flying too high, too far and too fast. As a result, the mission was two minutes longer than planned, and the re-entry subjected Ham to 14.7 g rather than the planned figure of approximately 12 g. The splashdown point was sixty miles from the nearest recovery ship, and it was over two and a half hours before a helicopter could recover the capsule and its passenger – by which time it had almost sunk. As a result, NASA was unwilling to launch the MR-3 mission without further development work; by late February, there were still seven major alterations they had made to the booster which required testing. An additional testing flight was accordingly added to the schedule, MR-BD (for "Booster Development"; it was originally known as MR-2A). This would launch on March 28, pushing the MR-3 flight back a month to April 25. The MR-BD flight was almost completely successful, ensuring that the crewed MR-3 flight could proceed without further significant delay.

The pilot for MR-3 had been chosen several months in advance, in early January, by the head of the program, Robert R. Gilruth. He had selected Alan Shepard (Navy) as the primary pilot, with John Glenn (Marine) and Gus Grissom (Air Force) as his backups; the other members of the Mercury Seven continued to train for later missions. The three names were announced to the press on February 22 without any indication as to which of the three was expected to fly the mission. Shepard's name was only announced publicly after the initial launch attempt had been canceled, as Gilruth wished to keep his options open in the event that last-minute personnel changes were required. Glenn served as Shepard's backup on launch day, with Grissom focusing on training for MR-4, the next suborbital mission.

== Naming ==
Captain Shepard dubbed his capsule Freedom 7. Per Shepard, "Pilots have always named their planes. It's a tradition. It never occurred to me not to name the capsule." Shepard discussed the name with his wife, Louise, backup pilot John Glenn, and Robert R. Gilruth, and all liked it.

They selected names ending with a "7" to commemorate the seven astronauts, although some sources indicate the "7" a reference to Shepard's spacecraft being factory model no. 7. Thus, Shepard set a double precedent, both for naming the Mercury spacecraft at all, and for the common structure of their naming.

== Flight ==
The initial launch attempt, on May 2, 1961, was canceled due to weather problems two hours and 20 minutes before the launch time, with Shepard waiting in a hangar already suited and prepared. The flight was rescheduled for two days later, when it was delayed one more day due to inclement weather conditions, until May 5, 1961, with an expected launch time of 7:20 a.m. EST. (Note: All local times quoted here are in Eastern Standard Time, as Florida did not observe daylight saving time until 1966.)

The countdown began at 8:30 p.m. the previous night, with Shepard waking up and eating a breakfast of steak and eggs with toast, coffee, and orange juice (the steak and eggs breakfast would soon become a tradition for astronauts the morning of a launch). He entered the spacecraft at 5:15 a.m. ET, just over two hours before the planned 7:20 launch time. At 7:05 a.m., the launch was held for an hour to let cloud cover clear – good visibility would be essential for photographs of the Earth – and fix a power supply unit; shortly after the count restarted, another hold was called in order to reboot a computer at Goddard Space Flight Center. The count was eventually resumed, after slightly over two and a half hours of unplanned holds, and continued with no further faults. All of the delays resulted in Shepard lying on his back in the capsule for almost three hours, by which point he complained to the blockhouse crew that he had a severe need to urinate (because the mission would last under 20 minutes, nobody had thought to equip the Mercury with a urine collection device). The crew told him that this was impossible as they would have to set the White Room back up and waste considerable amounts of time removing the Mercury's heavily bolted hatch. An irate Shepard then announced that if he could not get out for a bathroom trip, he would simply urinate in his suit. When the blockhouse protested that that would short out the medical electrodes on his body, he told them to simply turn the power off. They complied, and Shepard emptied his bladder. Because of the position he was sitting in, the urine pooled somewhat underneath his back and with oxygen flowing through the spacesuit, he was soon dried out, and the countdown resumed. After the mission, the Mercury space suit was modified and a liquid waste collection device was installed.

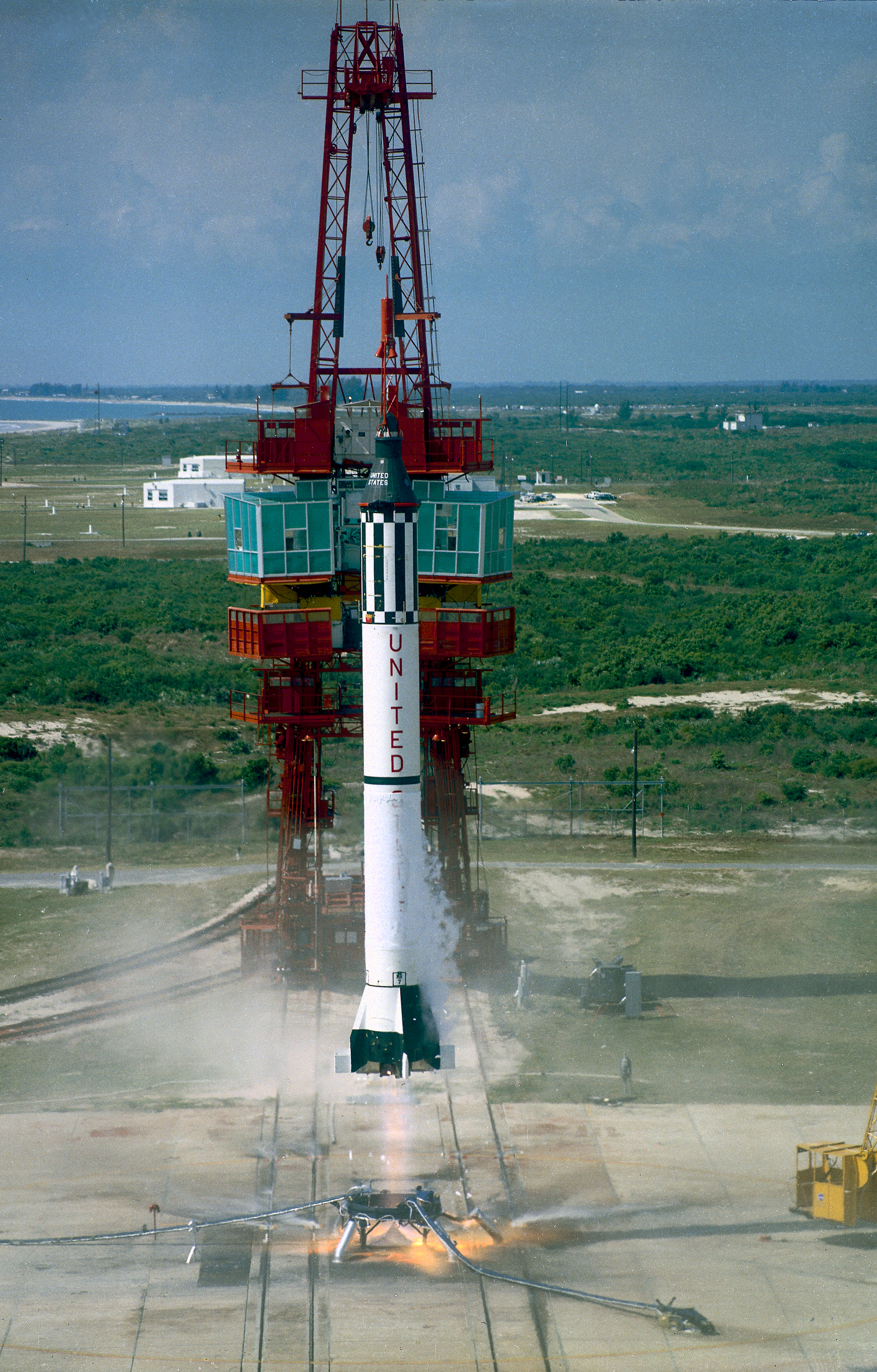
Launch of MR-3 on May 5, 1961

Mercury-Redstone 3 finally lifted off at 9:34 a.m. ET, watched by an estimated 45 million television viewers in the United States. Shepard was subjected to a maximum acceleration of 6.3 g just before the Redstone engine shut down, two minutes and 22 seconds after launch. Freedom 7's space-fixed velocity was 5,134 miles per hour (8,262 km/h), close to the planned value. Upon shutdown of the booster, the escape tower was jettisoned. Ten seconds later came capsule separation: the capsule detonated the explosive bolts on the Marman clamping ring that joined it to the booster and fired its posigrade rockets to gain distance. After capsule separation, the automated attitude control system (the Automatic Stabilization Control System, or ASCS) damped out any residual tumbling motions and then yawed Freedom 7 around 180 degrees, so the retrorockets would face forward ready for firing.

Shepard now began testing manual control of the spacecraft's orientation. For redundancy purposes, the Mercury spacecraft's manual attitude control system used a different set of control jets than the automatic system and had its own fuel supply; when the system was activated, moving the three-axis control stick proportionally opened valves to the manual jets. The system could be selectively enabled on each axis, with ASCS automatically controlling the non-enabled axes. Shepard gradually assumed manual control, one axis at a time, leaving the remaining axes to ASCS. First he took manual control of pitch, reorienting the spacecraft from its "orbit attitude" of 14 degrees nose-down pitch to the retrofire attitude of 34 degrees nose-down pitch, then returning to orbit attitude. He then took manual control of yaw along with pitch, yawing the spacecraft to the left and then to the right to bring it back in line. Finally he assumed control of roll as well, testing it and then restoring the spacecraft's roll to normal. Once Shepard had taken control of all three axes, he found that the spacecraft's manual response was about the same as that of the Mercury simulator; however, he could not hear the jets firing, as he could on the ground, due to the levels of background noise.

Shepard's next task was to make observations of the ground from the spacecraft's periscope, which extended through the "bottom" of the hull beneath his feet. Shepard's craft, an earlier version of the Mercury capsule, also had two small round viewing windows, one on each side, but the periscope was its primary means for observing. The periscope could be set either to a low-magnification wide-angle view or to a high-magnification narrow-angle view, and different optical filters could be inserted by turning a knob. During his long wait on the launch pad, Shepard had inserted a medium-gray filter in the periscope to cut down on sun glare, but he had not had time to undo this before launch. He found that when he tried to reach the filter knob to change it, the wrist of his spacesuit would bump the handle by his left hand that would manually activate the launch escape system. Even though the escape tower was long gone, Shepard gave up on trying to change the filter out of caution, leaving it in for the rest of the flight. Although the gray filter washed out colors, Shepard was still easily able to distinguish major land masses from clouds. He reported identifying major features such as the east coast of Florida, Lake Okeechobee, and Andros Island, the largest island of the Bahamas, but cloud cover made it difficult for him to make out other Bahamian islands.

With the spacecraft still under manual control, but now using the periscope rather than the panel instruments for his attitude reference, Shepard had maintained his roll and yaw attitude, but he had inadvertently let the spacecraft drift in pitch. As the spacecraft approached the highest point of its suborbital arc, the "start retro sequence" light came on, alerting Shepard that the three retrorockets were about to fire. They would do this in sequence five seconds apart, burning for ten seconds each. Shepard began adjusting his pitch nose downward toward the proper retrofire attitude of –34 degrees, but he only got to around orbit attitude (–14 degrees) before the first retrorocket fired. He then got his pitch further down to about –25 degrees in time for the second and third retrorockets. This pitch discrepancy was not critical for this flight, because Shepard's suborbital trajectory would lead to reentry anyway, and the difference in pitch wouldn't affect Shepard's landing location much; Shepard was only testing the pilot's ability to manually control the spacecraft's attitude during retrofire. In his initial postflight debriefing, Shepard reported that he must have somehow gotten confused about his pitch attitude, but as it turned out he was the victim of a misunderstanding. This particular spacecraft's pitch indicator had originally been set so that its reference position for retrofire attitude, which was the "nine o'clock" position on the indicator, was at –43 degrees pitch, rather than the –34 degrees later decided upon for retrofire. Shepard had assumed it was still set that way and deliberately adjusted his pitch high to compensate. But in fact the indicator had been changed, with the "nine o'clock" reference position being updated to the correct –34 degrees. Somehow Shepard had not been informed, so his compensation made his pitch too high.

Just after retrofire, Shepard switched into the "fly-by-wire" control mode, where the pilot's motions of the three-axis control stick electrically triggered the control jets of the automatic system to fire for the desired positioning, rather than proportionally opening the manual system's control jets. Soon afterward, the retrorocket pack was automatically jettisoned. This pack was attached over the heatshield by straps and so was normally released before reentry. Shepard heard the noise of the jettison and saw one of the straps fly past a window, but the confirmation light did not turn on. However, fellow Mercury astronaut Deke Slayton, who was acting as capsule communicator ("CAPCOM") in the Mercury Control Center, confirmed to Shepard that the pack had jettisoned, so Shepard activated the manual override for the jettison system to trigger the light. It was later determined that the retro-jettison light hadn't activated because of an issue with the electrically triggered pyrotechnic "squibs" that were fired to release the retrorocket pack. These squibs, when triggered, could draw excessive current from the electrical system, dropping its voltage to the point that the timer which was supposed to activate the retro-jettison light got reset. The squibs were modified to prevent this problem in future missions.

Shepard reported that fly-by-wire felt smooth and gave the sensation of being fully in command of the craft, before letting the automatic systems briefly take over to reorient the capsule for reentry. He then kept control until the g-forces peaked at 11.6 g during re-entry; he held the capsule until it had stabilized and then relinquished control to the automated system. The descent was faster than anticipated, but the parachutes deployed as planned, a drogue at 21,000 ft (6.4 km) and a main parachute at 10,000 ft (3.0 km).

Splashdown occurred with an impact comparable to landing a jet aircraft on an aircraft carrier. Freedom 7 tilted over on its right side about 60 degrees from an upright position, but did not show any signs of leaking; it gently righted itself after a minute, and Shepard was able to report to the circling aircraft that he had landed safely and was ready to be recovered. A recovery helicopter arrived after a few minutes, and after a brief problem with the spacecraft antenna, the capsule was lifted partly out of the water in order to allow Shepard to leave by the main hatch. He squeezed out of the door and into a sling hoist, and was pulled into the helicopter, which flew both the astronaut and his spacecraft to a waiting aircraft carrier, USS Lake Champlain. The whole recovery process had taken only eleven minutes, from splashdown to arriving aboard.

The flight lasted 15 minutes, 22 seconds and the spacecraft traveled 302 miles (486 km) from its launch point, ascending to 116.5 miles (187.5 km). Freedom 7 landed at these coordinates: 27.23°N 75.88°W. It reached a speed of 5,180 mph (8,340 km/h). Besides that, the spaceflight mission featured the first manual pilot control of the spacecraft.

Following the flight the spacecraft was examined by engineers and found to be in excellent shape, so much so that they decided it could have been safely used again in another launch. Given to the Smithsonian Institution by NASA, Freedom 7 was previously displayed at the U.S. Naval Academy in Annapolis, Maryland until 2012. In 2012, it was on display at the John F. Kennedy Library in Boston, Massachusetts. Beginning on May 5, 2021, the 60th Anniversary of the First American in Space, the Mercury-Redstone (MR-3) spacecraft Freedom 7 was on display and exhibited at the Smithsonian's Steven F. Udvar-Hazy Center located in Chantilly, Virginia. It currently is on display at the Smithsonian's National Air and Space Museum located in Washington, D.C.

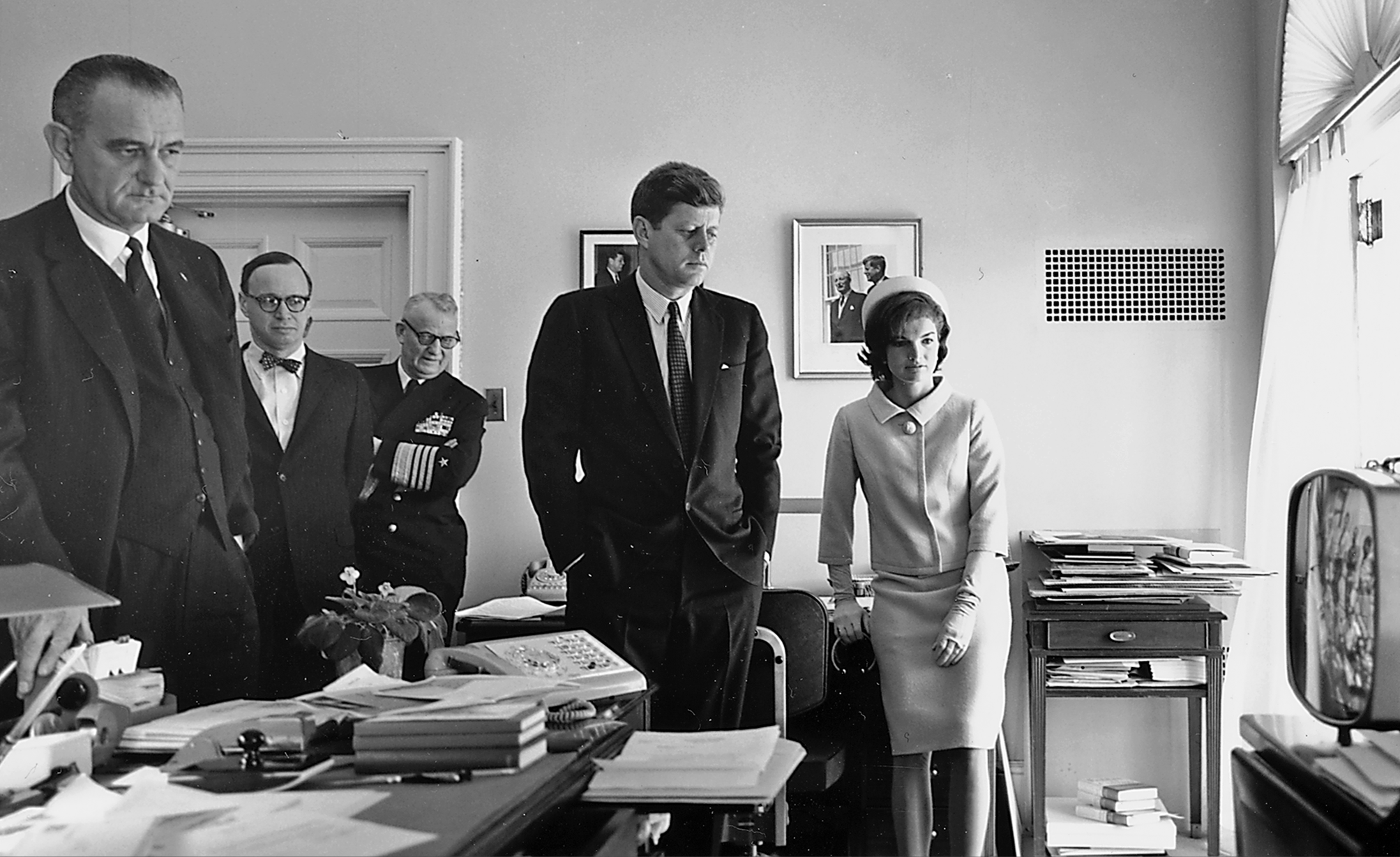
President Kennedy watching the flight on TV together with the First Lady, Vice President Johnson and others

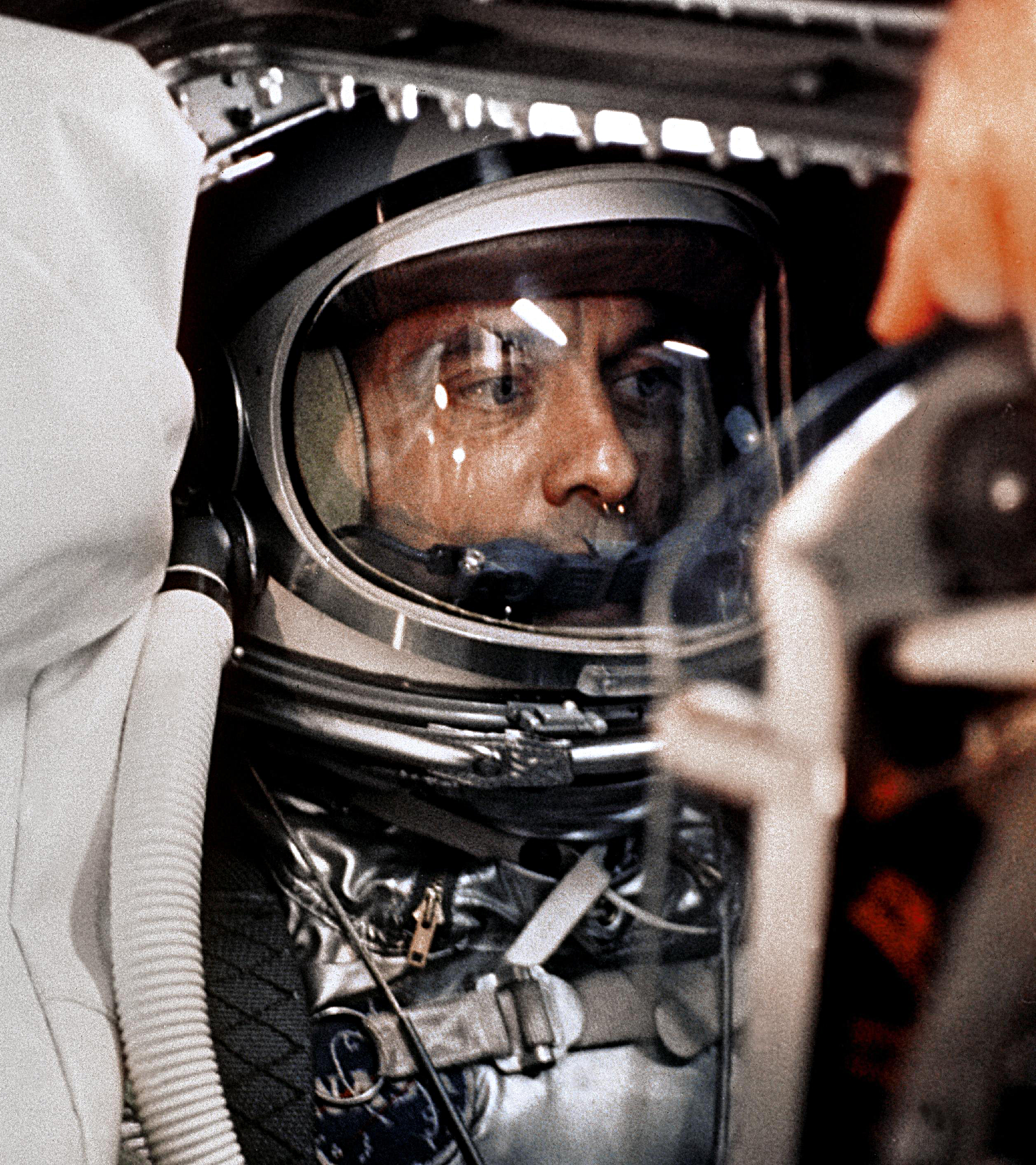
Alan Shepard in Freedom 7 spacecraft before launch

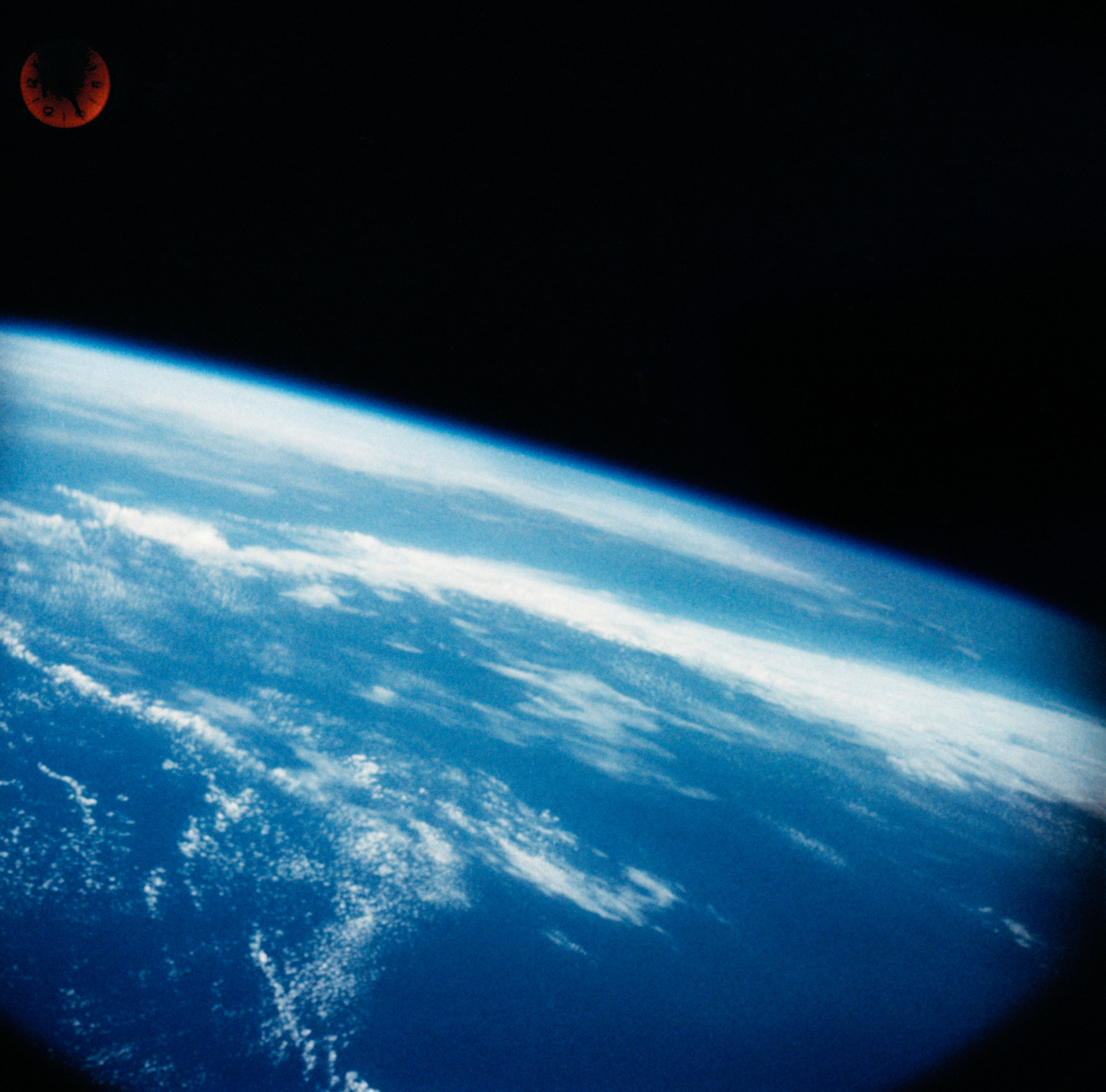
Photo taken by 70 mm Earth-Sky Camera mounted on the spacecraft

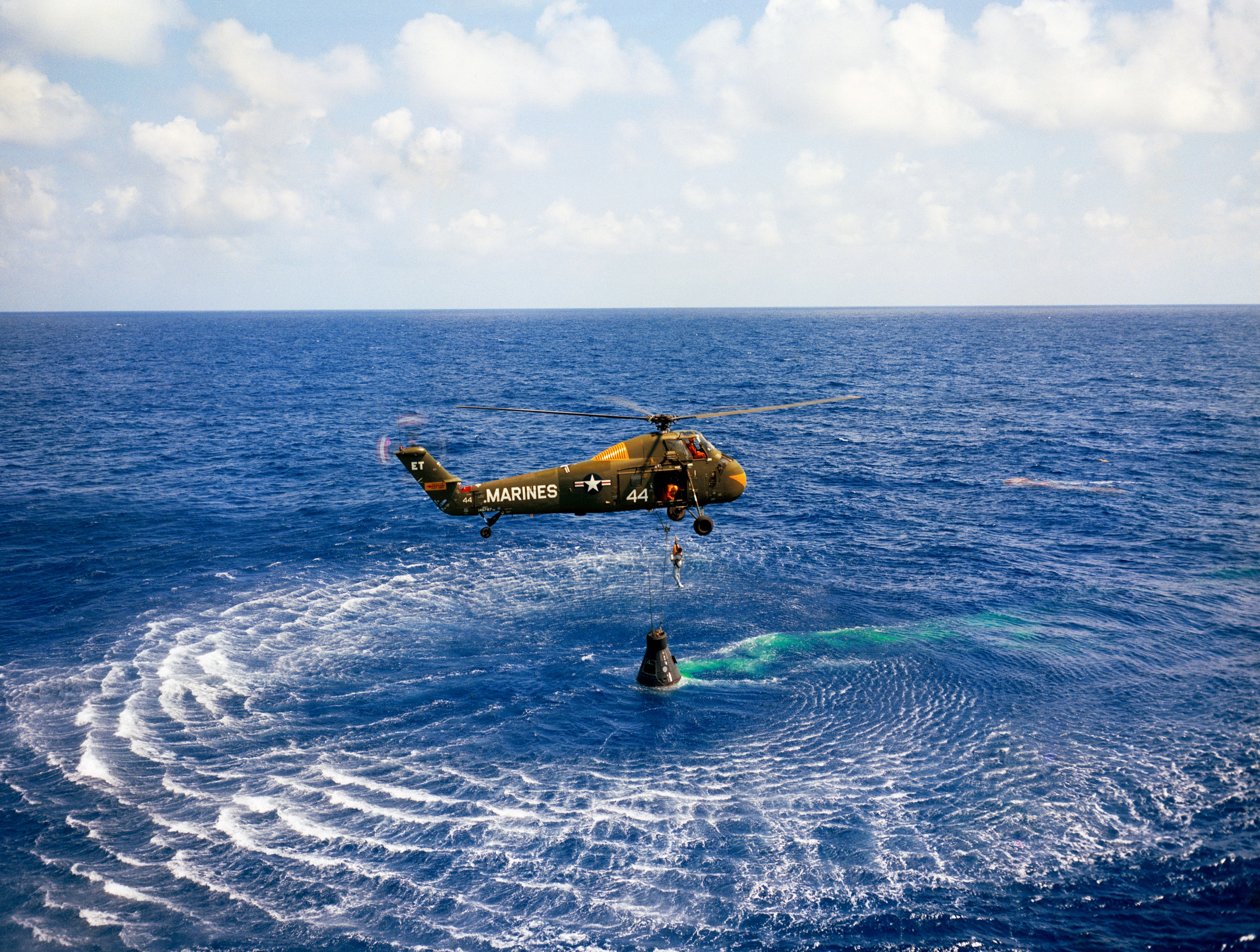
HUS-1 helicopter from USS Lake Champlain recovering Alan Shepard from the Freedom 7 capsule

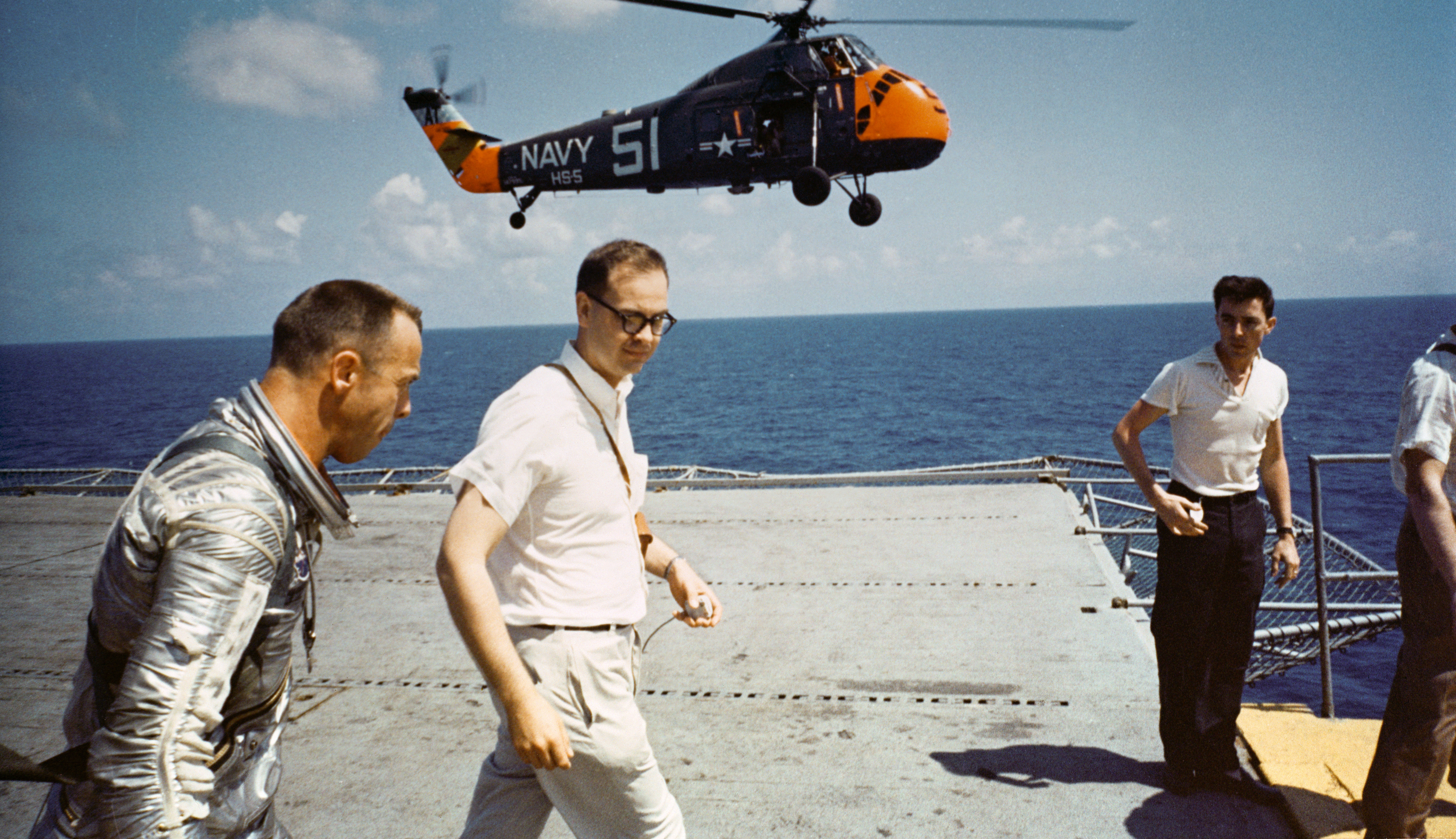
Alan Shepard on the deck of the aircraft carrier USS Lake Champlain after recovery of Freedom 7

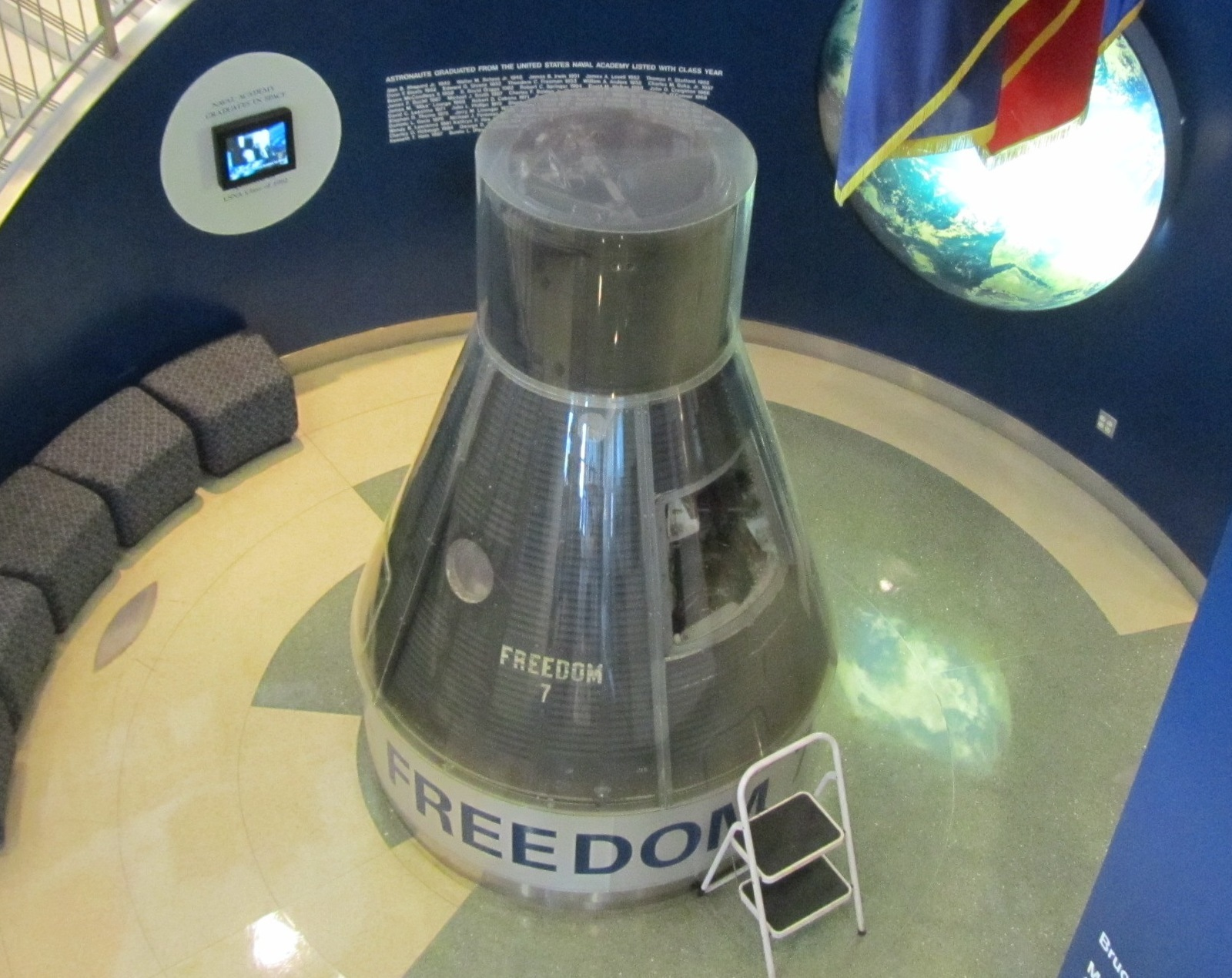
Freedom 7 formerly on display at the U.S. Naval Academy (now displayed at the Smithsonian's National Air and Space Museum in Washington, D.C.)

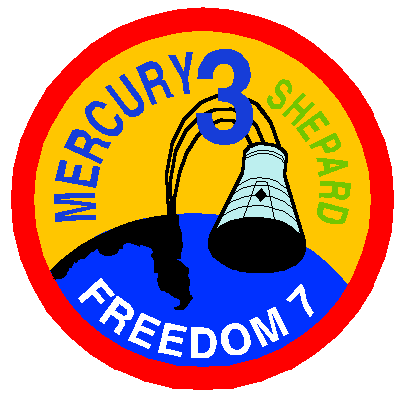
Mission insignia

== Depiction in popular culture ==
In June 1961, Laurie Records issued a 45 rpm single featuring William Allen and Orchestra entitled "Space Flight Freedom 7". It consisted of recreations of the tower to astronaut communications spoken over an instrumental backing.

The Mercury-Redstone 3 mission was dramatized in Tom Wolfe's 1979 book The Right Stuff, Philip Kaufman's 1983 film The Right Stuff based on the book (Scott Glenn plays Shepard), the 1998 HBO miniseries From the Earth to the Moon episode "Can We Do This?" (starring Ted Levine as Shepard) and the 2016 film Hidden Figures (Dane Davenport plays Shepard). In the 2020 mini-series The Right Stuff, Jake McDorman plays Shepard.

In the 2008 video game Fallout 3, the player can visit the Museum of Technology in the ruins of Washington, D.C., two centuries after a nuclear war. The game takes place in an alternate timeline that diverges from reality after World War II. In the museum is an exhibit about a slightly different version of Mercury-Redstone 3/Freedom 7 called Defiance 7 that launched on May 5, 1961 (the day Freedom 7 was launched), and was piloted by fictional astronaut Carl Bell. The exhibit states that Bell was the first human in space in this timeline and did not survive the space flight, having died in a crash landing. His skeleton and space suit were donated to the museum and are on display there.

== Flight events ==
Flights events of the Mercury-Redstone 3 mission

Time (mm:ss)	Event	Description
00:00	Liftoff	Mercury-Redstone lifts off, onboard clock starts.
00:24	Pitch Program	Redstone pitches over at average rate 0.67 deg/s from 90 deg to 41 deg.
01:24	Max Q	Maximum dynamic pressure ~575 lbf/ft² (28 kPa).
02:12	End Pitch Program	Redstone reaches 41 deg pitch.
02:20	BECO	Redstone engine shutdown – Booster Engine Cutoff. Velocity 5,200 mph (2.3 km/s)
02:22	Tower Jettison	Escape Tower Jettison, no longer needed.
02:24	Spacecraft Separation	Posigrade rockets fire for 1 s giving 15 ft/s (4.6 m/s) separation.
02:35	Turnaround Maneuver	Spacecraft (ASCS) system rotates spacecraft 180 degrees, to heat shield forward attitude.
02:35	Manual Control	Manual controls unlocked. Pilot tests all axes.
04:44	Retro Attitude Maneuver	ASCS orients spacecraft to 34 degrees nose down pitch, 0 degrees roll, 0 degrees yaw.
05:00	Apogee	Apogee of about 115 miles (185 km) reached at 150 miles (240 km) downrange from launch site.
05:15	Retrofire	Three retro rockets fire for 10 seconds each. They are started at 5-second intervals, firing overlaps. 550 ft/s (170 m/s) is taken off forward velocity.
05:45	Retract Periscope	Periscope is automatically retracted in preparation for reentry.
06:15	Retro Pack Jettison	One minute after retrofire retro pack is jettisoned, leaving heat shield clear.
07:15	0.05 g (0.5 m/s²) Maneuver	(ASCS) detects beginning of reentry and rolls spacecraft at 10 deg/s to stabilize spacecraft during reentry.
09:38	Drogue Parachute Deploy	Drogue parachute deployed at 22,000 ft (6.7 km) slowing descent to 365 ft/s (111 m/s) and stabilizing spacecraft.
09:45	Snorkel Deploy	Fresh air snorkel deploys at 20,000 ft (6.1 km). (ECS) switches to emergency oxygen rate to cool cabin.
10:15	Main Parachute Deploy	Main parachute deploys at 10,000 ft (3.0 km). Descent rate slows to 30 ft/s (9.1 m/s)
10:20	Landing Bag Deploy	Landing bag deploys, dropping heat shield down 4 ft (1.2 m).
10:20	Fuel Dump	Remaining hydrogen peroxide fuel automatically dumped.
15:22	Splashdown	Spacecraft lands in water about 300 mi (480 km) downrange from launch site.
15:30	Rescue Aids Deploy	Rescue aid package deployed. The package includes green dye marker, recovery radio beacon and whip antenna.

== See also ==
- Vostok 1 and Yuri Gagarin, the first human space flight (April 12, 1961)
- Mercury Seven, the Mercury astronauts
