= Cosmonautics Day =

Russian holiday

Cosmonautics Day День космонавтики Den kosmonavtiki
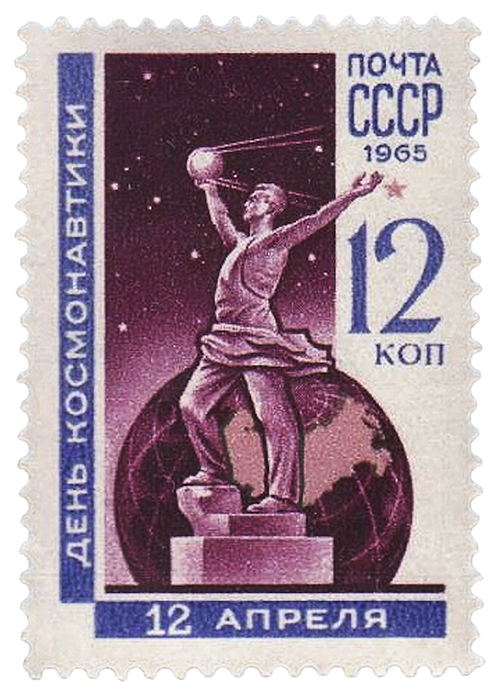
- 1965 Soviet postage stamp commemorating Cosmonautics Day
- Observed by: Russia, former USSR
- Type: Historical
- Significance: A celebration to commemorate the first man in space
- Date: 12 April
- Next time: 12 April 2027
- Frequency: Annual
- Related to: Yuri's Night

Cosmonautics Day (Russian: День Космона́втики, romanized: Den' Kosmonávtiki) is an anniversary celebrated in Russia and some other post-Soviet states on 12 April. In 2011, at the 65th session of the United Nations General Assembly, 12 April was declared as the International Day of Human Space Flight in dedication of the first crewed space flight made on 12 April 1961 by the 27-year-old Soviet Russian cosmonaut Yuri Gagarin. Gagarin orbited the Earth for 1 hour and 48 minutes aboard the Vostok 1 spacecraft.

== History ==
The commemorative day was established in the Soviet Union one year later, on 9 April 1962. In modern Russia, it is celebrated in accordance with Article 1.1 of the Law "On the Days of Military Glory and the Commemorative Dates in Russia".

Gagarin's flight was a triumph for the Soviet space program, and opened a new era in the history of space exploration. Gagarin became a national hero of the Soviet Union and Eastern Bloc and a famous figure around the world. Major newspapers around the globe published his biography and details of his flight. Moscow and other cities in the USSR held mass demonstrations, the scale of which was second only to World War II Victory Parades. Gagarin was escorted in a long motorcade of high-ranking officials through the streets of Moscow to the Kremlin where, in a lavish ceremony, he was awarded the highest Soviet honour, the title of Hero of the Soviet Union, by the Soviet leader Nikita Khrushchev.

Nowadays the commemoration ceremony on Cosmonautics Day starts in the city of Korolyov, near Gagarin's statue. Participants then proceed under police escort to Red Square for a visit to Gagarin's grave in the Kremlin Wall Necropolis, and continue to Cosmonauts Alley, near the Monument to the Conquerors of Space. Finally, the festivities conclude with a visit to the Novodevichy Cemetery.

In 1968, the 61st conference of the Fédération Aéronautique Internationale resolved to celebrate this day as the World Aviation and Astronautics Day.

On 12 April 1981, exactly 20 years after Vostok 1, a Space Shuttle (STS-1, Columbia) was launched for the first orbital flight, although this was a coincidence as the launch of STS-1 had been delayed for two days.

On 7 April 2011, the United Nations General Assembly adopted a resolution declaring 12 April as the International Day of Human Space Flight.

In the 1960s, the song 14 минут до старта ("14 Minutes Until Start") written by Oscar Feltsman and Vladimir Voynovich was considered the unofficial "anthem of cosmonautics" and regularly aired on this day in the USSR. Adapted into a march, it is played in all military parades as a sort of march past of the Russian Space Forces. In the 1980s, it was eclipsed by the hit Трава у дома ("Grass by the Home") performed by the Russian VIA band Zemlyane ("The Earthlings"). The latter song was awarded the official status of the anthem of Russian Cosmonautics in 2009. Russian cosmonauts have traditionally taken this song with them getting assigned for orbital deployments.

Since 2001, Yuri's Night, also known as the "World's Space party", is held every 12 April worldwide to commemorate milestones in space exploration.

On 12 April 2017, the United Nations commemorated the "International Day of Human Space Flight" to celebrate the 56th anniversary of the first human space flight, which ushered in the beginning of the space era for mankind.

== Gallery ==
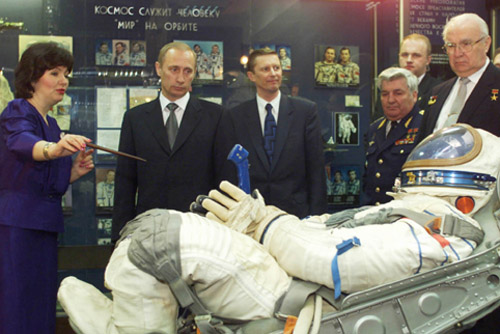
Russian president Vladimir Putin in the House of Memorial Museum of Cosmonautics on Cosmonautics Day 2001

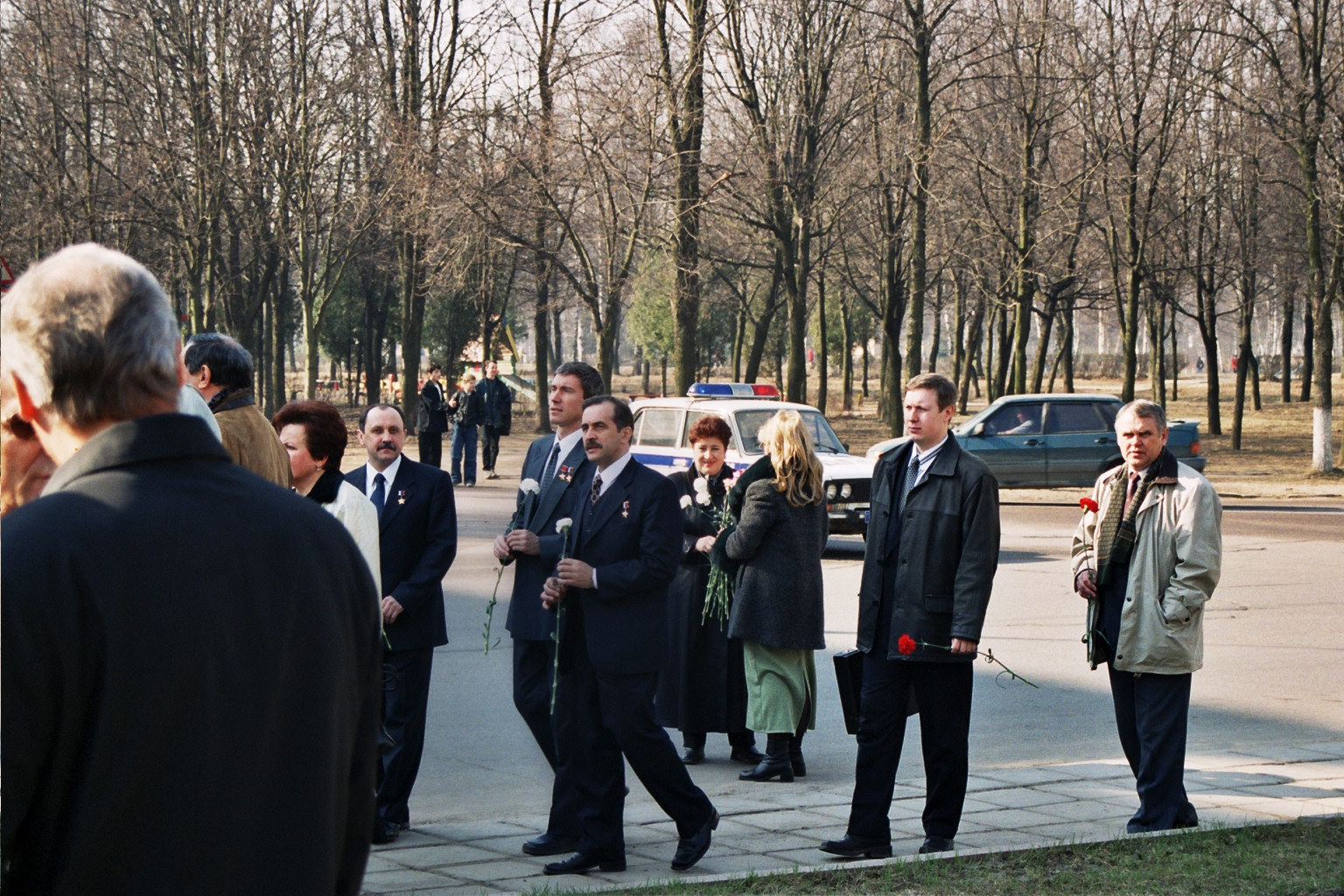
Russian cosmonaut Sergei Krikalyov on his way to lay a flower at the base of Yuri Gagarin's statue in Korolyov on Cosmonautics Day 2002

Fireworks in Moscow to the 50th Anniversary of spaceflight in 2011

Cosmonautics Day, Ukraine, 2021

In philately and numismatics

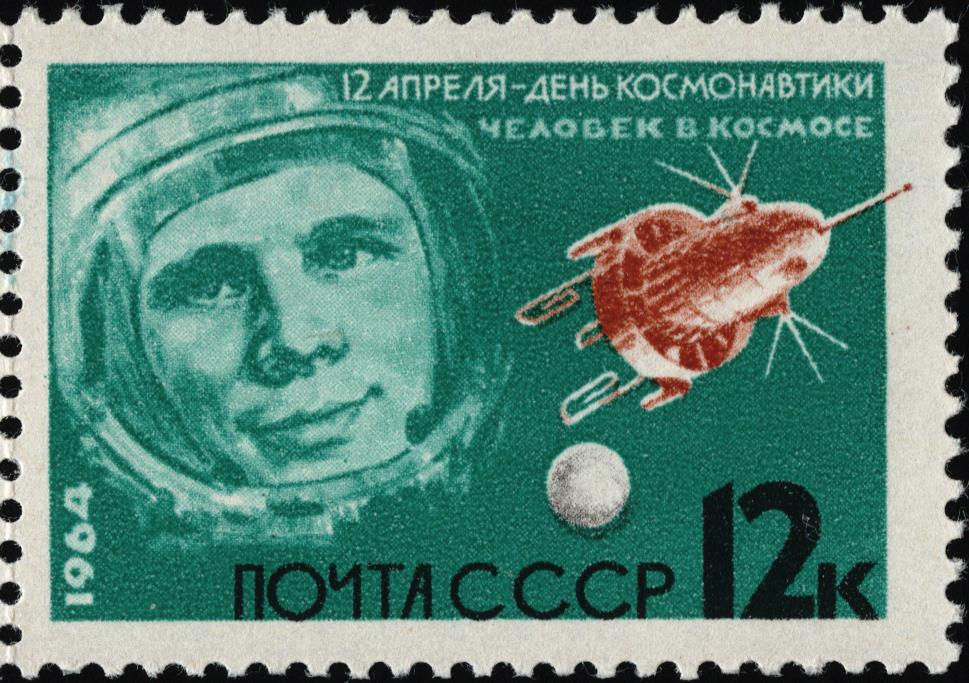
Soviet stamp with Yuri Gagarin, 1964

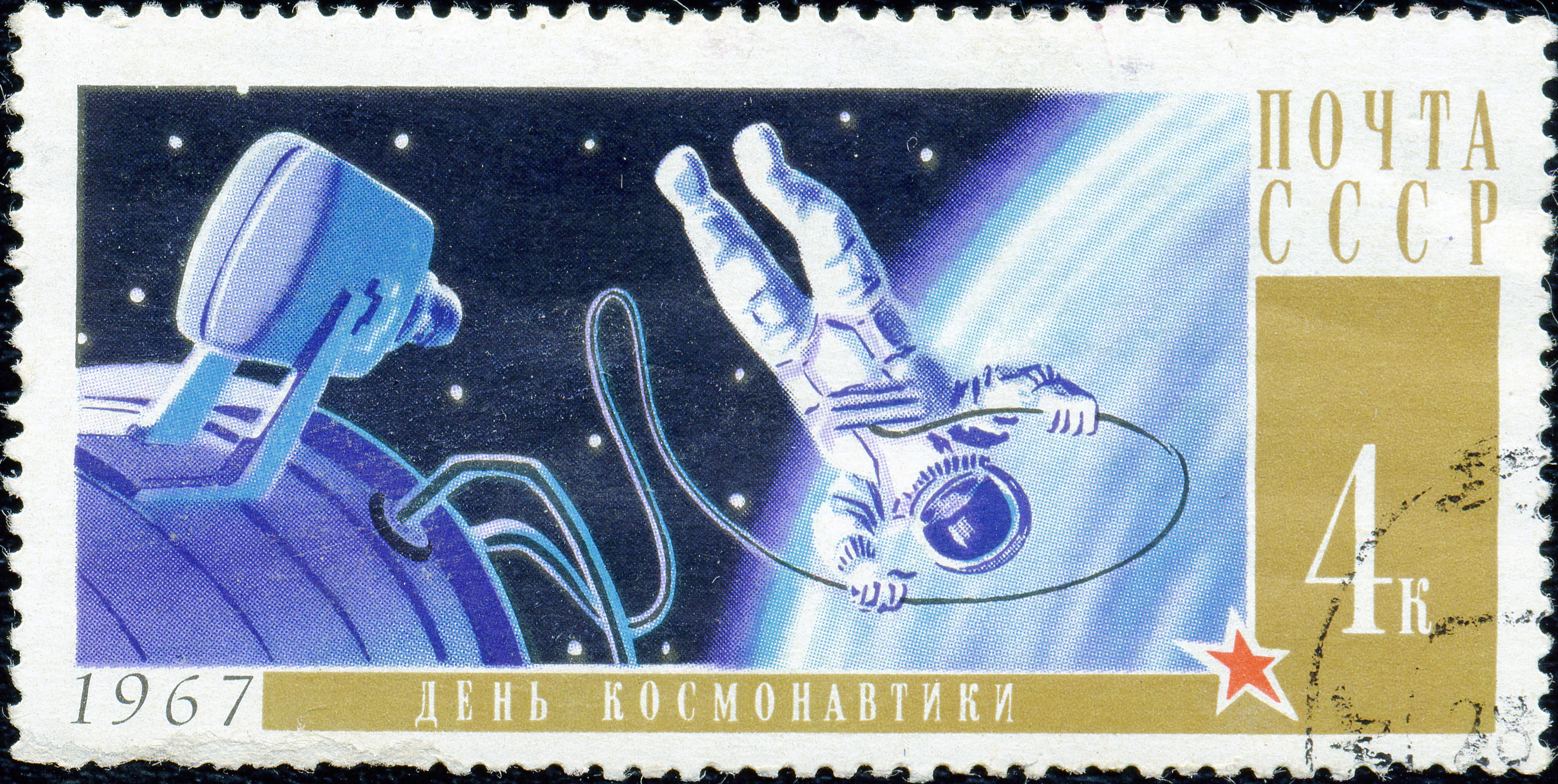
Soviet stamp with Alexei Leonov, 1967

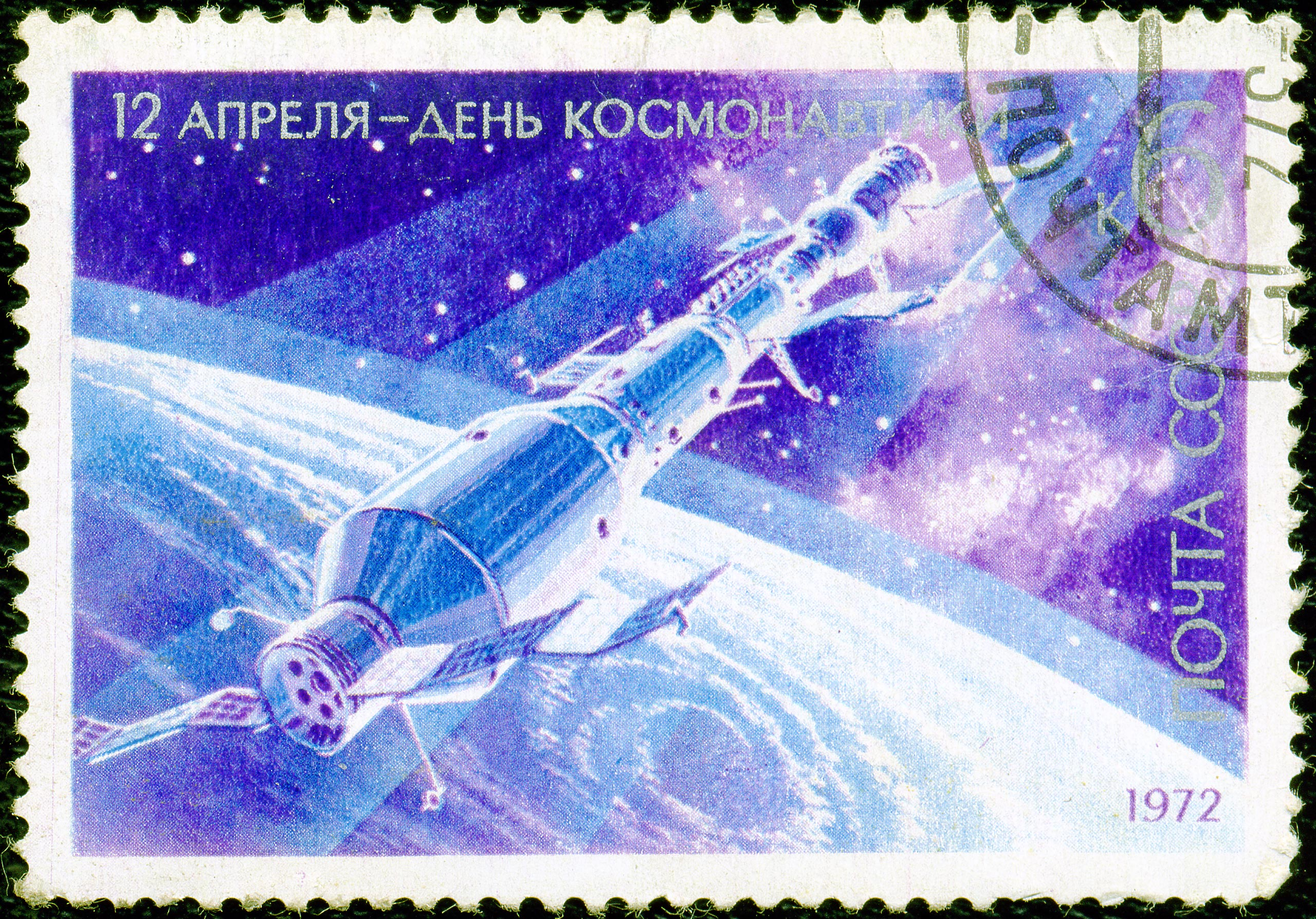
Soviet stamp, 1972

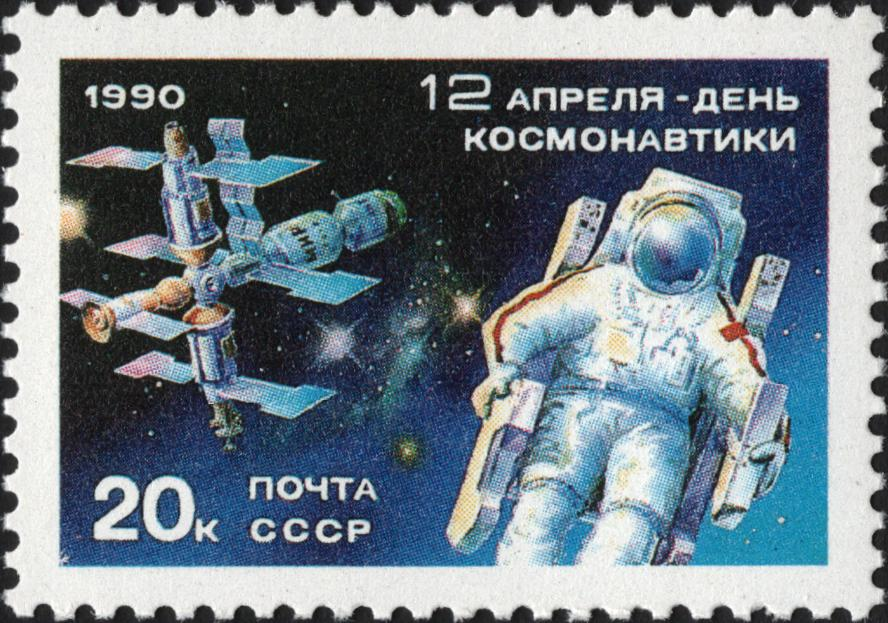
Soviet stamp with "Mir" space station, 1990

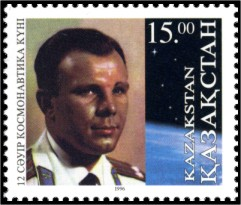
Kazakh stamp, 1996

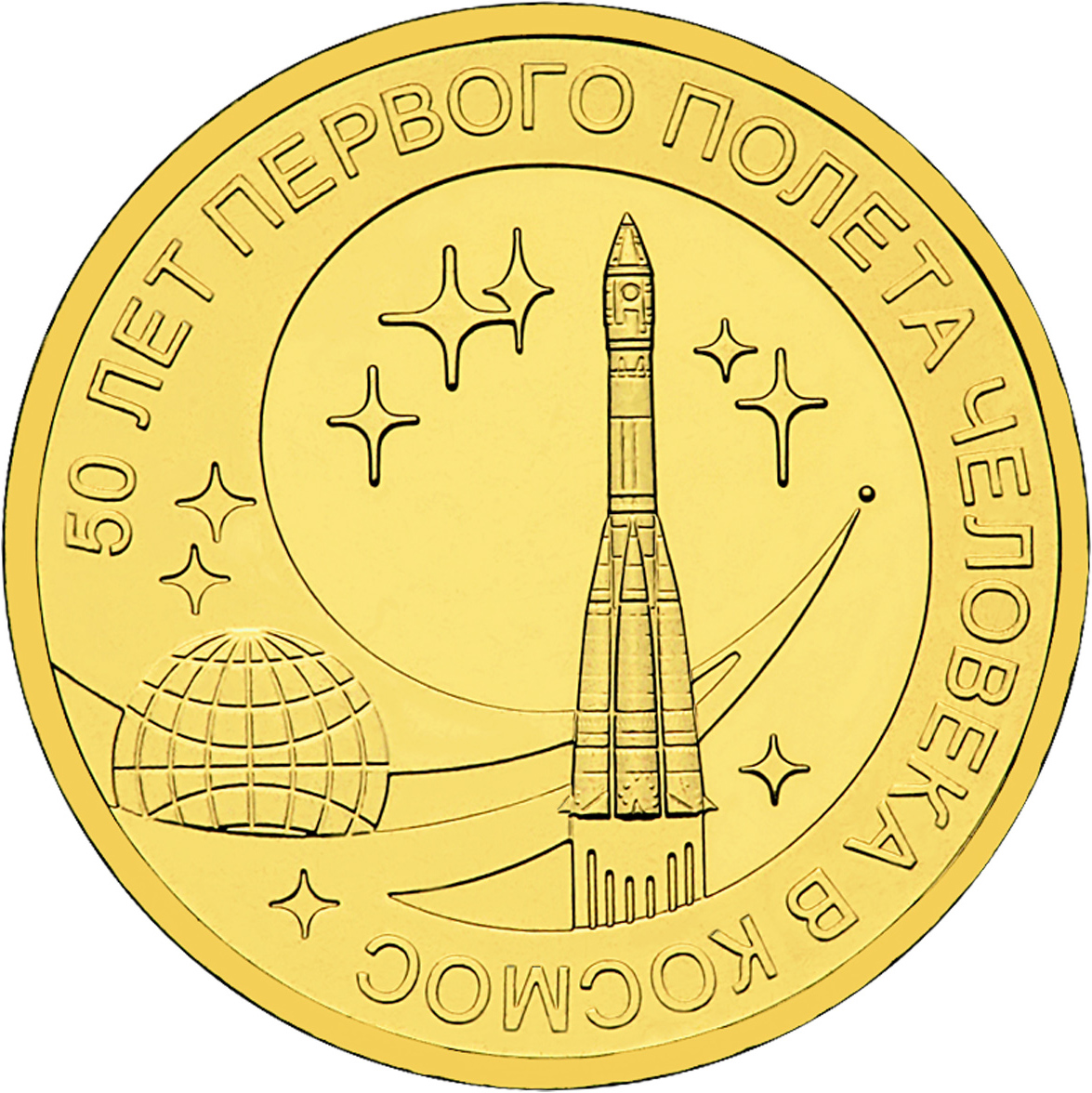
Jubilee coin "50 лет первого полёта человека в космос", Russia, 2011

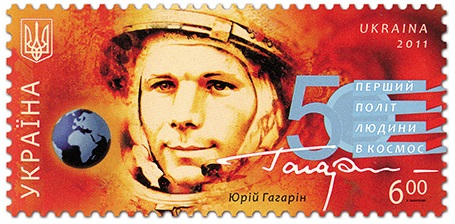
Jubilee stamp, Ukraine, 2011

== See also ==
- Astronauts Day
- Yuri's Night
