= World Space Week =

Annual observance, October 4–10

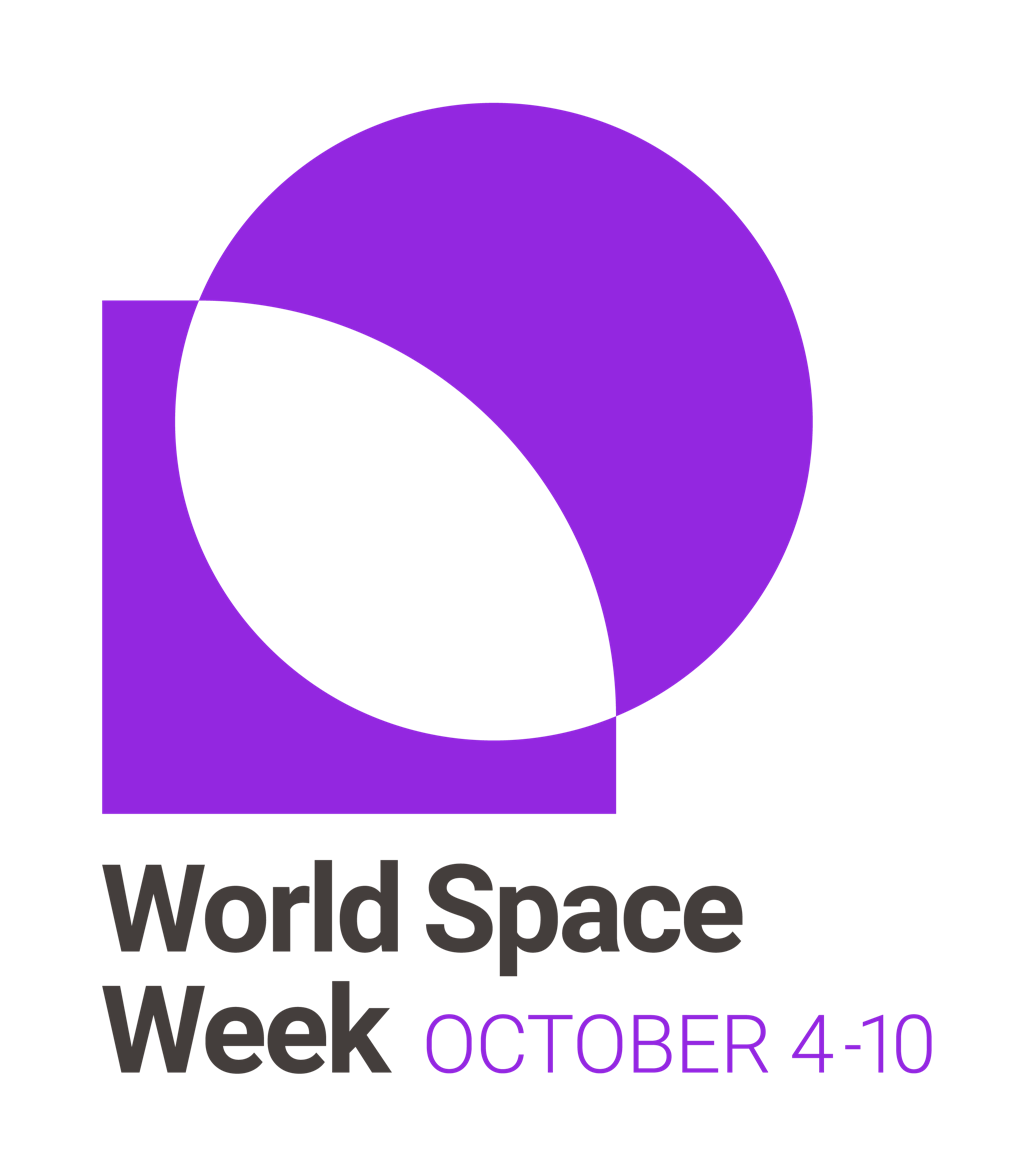
- World Space Week logo
- Observed by: Worldwide
- Type: United Nations
- Observances: more than 95 countries
- Begins: October 4
- Ends: October 10
- Date: October 4, October 5, October 6, October 7, October 8, October 9, October 10
- Duration: 7 days
- Frequency: annual

The World Space Week (WSW) is an annual holiday observed to celebrate outer space activities. It is observed from October 4 to 10 in over 95 nations throughout the world. World Space Week is defined as an international celebration of space science and space technology, and their contribution to the betterment of the human condition". World Space Week is organized every year by the coordination of the World Space Week Association (WSWA) and the United Nations (UN), the UN Office for Outer Space Affairs and the UN Committee on the Peaceful Uses of Outer Space.

== History ==
On December 6, 1999, the United Nations General Assembly declared World Space Week as an annual event to be commemorated between October 4 and 10. The choice of dates was based on recognition of two important dates in space history: the launch of the first human-made Earth satellite, Sputnik 1, on October 4, 1957; and the date when the Outer Space Treaty went into force, October 10, 1967.

World Space Week is the largest annual space event in the world. In 2019, World Space Week was celebrated with over 8,000 events in 96 countries. Events included school activities, exhibitions, government events, and special activities at planetaria around the world.

== Annual themes ==
Each year, a theme for World Space Week is established by the Board of Directors of World Space Week Association. Under the theme "The Moon: Gateway to the Stars", many events of World Space Week 2019 focused on the 50th anniversary of the Apollo 11 landing, plans for human exploration of the Moon, and Lunar observation by telescope.

World Space Week Themes (2020–2026)
| Year | Theme | Source |
|---|---|---|
| 2026 | "Rocket Revolution" | |
| 2025 | "Living In Space" | |
| 2024 | "Space & Climate Change" | |
| 2023 | "Space and Entrepreneurship" | |
| 2022 | "Space and Sustainability" | |
| 2021 | "Women in Space" | |
| 2020 | "Satellites Improve Life" (Note: SES CEO Steve Collar served as the Honorary Chair for this year.) | |

== Activities and observances ==
The World Space Week Association is a non-governmental, non-profit organization that is supported by national coordinators in over 50 nations. It is led by an all-volunteer Board of Directors, including Buzz Aldrin, Bill Nye the Science Guy, Tom Hanks, Dumitru Prunariu, and space leaders from around the world. Its goals are to educate people around the world about the benefits that they receive from space, encourage the use of space for sustainable economic development, foster enthusiastic education and interest in science, and cooperation between nations through space outreach and education.

The association provides resources for educators in grades K-12.

A Calendar of Events from nations celebrating World Space Week is available.

SPACE India is the only Regional Coordinator of World Space Week in India.

== See also ==
- International Day of Human Space Flight
