= Yuri's Night =

Holiday to commemorate space exploration

- Classic Yuri's Night 'Yurihead' logo (2021—present)
- Genre: Space exploration
- Date: April 12
- Frequency: Annually
- Location: International
- Inaugurated: April 12, 2001
- Website: yurisnight.net
- Commemorates flight of Vostok 1 in 1961

Yuri's Night is an international celebration held every April 12 to commemorate milestones in space exploration. It is named for the first human to launch into space, Yuri Gagarin, who flew the Vostok 1 spaceship on April 12, 1961. In 2011, the fiftieth anniversary of Gagarin's flight, Yuri's Night was celebrated at over 567 events in 75 countries on seven continents. Yuri's Night is often called the "World Space Party". The launch of STS-1, the first Space Shuttle mission, is also honored, as it was launched 20 years to the day after Vostok 1, on April 12, 1981 (although the date of STS-1 is just a coincidence, the launch having been delayed for two days due to a technical problem).

== Objective ==
The goal of Yuri's Night is to increase public interest in space exploration and to inspire a new generation of explorers. Driven by space-inspired artistic expression and culminating in a worldwide network of annual celebrations and educational events, Yuri's Night creates a global community of young people committed to shaping the future of space exploration while developing responsible leaders and innovators with a global perspective. These global events are a showcase for elements of culture that embrace space including music, dance, fashion, and art.

== History of Yuri's Night ==
Yuri's Night was created in 2000 by Loretta Hidalgo Whitesides, George T. Whitesides and Trish Garner. The first Yuri's Night was held on April 12, 2001, exactly 40 years after the launch of Vostok 1. Since 1962, April 12 has been celebrated in Russia (formerly the Soviet Union) as Cosmonautics Day (Russian: День Космонавтики) and since 2011 internationally as the International Day of Human Space Flight.

The 2004 Yuri's Night event in Los Angeles was attended by space-related figures including author Ray Bradbury, space tourist Dennis Tito, X-Prize founder Peter Diamandis, *NSYNC's Lance Bass, and Nichelle Nichols (Uhura from the original Star Trek series). The event included a large party with two dance floors and world-class DJs.

The 2007 event in the San Francisco Bay Area was held at NASA Ames Research Center at Moffett Field in Mountain View, CA. The event featured artistic installations, technology demonstrations, and DJ music continuing through dawn of the following day.

April 2011 marked the 50th anniversary of Gagarin's historic first flight. Over 100,000 people attended 567 Yuri's Night parties in 75 countries, and the crew of Expedition 27 recorded a Yuri's Night celebratory greeting from the International Space Station.

In April 2021, Yuri's Night was held virtually amid the ongoing COVID-19 pandemic. The event consisted of a hosted global live stream alongside some private, ticketed virtual events. Some notable guests included Brian May, Bill Nye, Tim Dodd, and Richard Branson.

In 2022, during the Russian invasion of Ukraine, the Space Foundation announced that it would change the name of its 2022 Yuri's Night celebrations from "Yuri's Night" to "A Celebration of Space: Discover What's Next" as part of a large-scale boycott of Russia in solidarity with Ukraine because Yuri Gagarin was born in Russia. Gagarin's spaceflight was flown in the name of the entire Soviet Union, dissolved in 1991, which included among other Soviet Republics, both Russia and Ukraine.

== Yuri's Night today ==
Yuri's Night events "combine space-themed partying with education and outreach". Parties and events are held at NASA centers, museums, planetariums, schools, bars, nightclubs, houses, and other locations. Often, guests are encouraged to dress up in various space-themed attire to add to the ambiance of the show. Space-themed art, sculptures and guests are often showcased at the events. Event sizes range from small to large and often attract large crowds with headlining musical acts such as Les Claypool, N*E*R*D, Common, NASA, and The Crystal Method.

Yuri's Night has been celebrated in locations including Reno, Ottawa, Los Angeles, the San Francisco Bay Area, Huntsville, Alabama, New Orleans, Inverness, Stockholm, Tel Aviv, Tokyo, Lisbon, Helsinki, Afghanistan, Nairobi, Latvia, Romania, Peru, Antarctica, and the International Space Station, in addition to many other locations and virtual online celebrations.

Yuri's Night is organized on a global level by an all-volunteer "Executive Team", which provides logistical and promotional support to Yuri's Night events worldwide. Individual organizers are responsible for registering and running their local events.

== Photo gallery ==
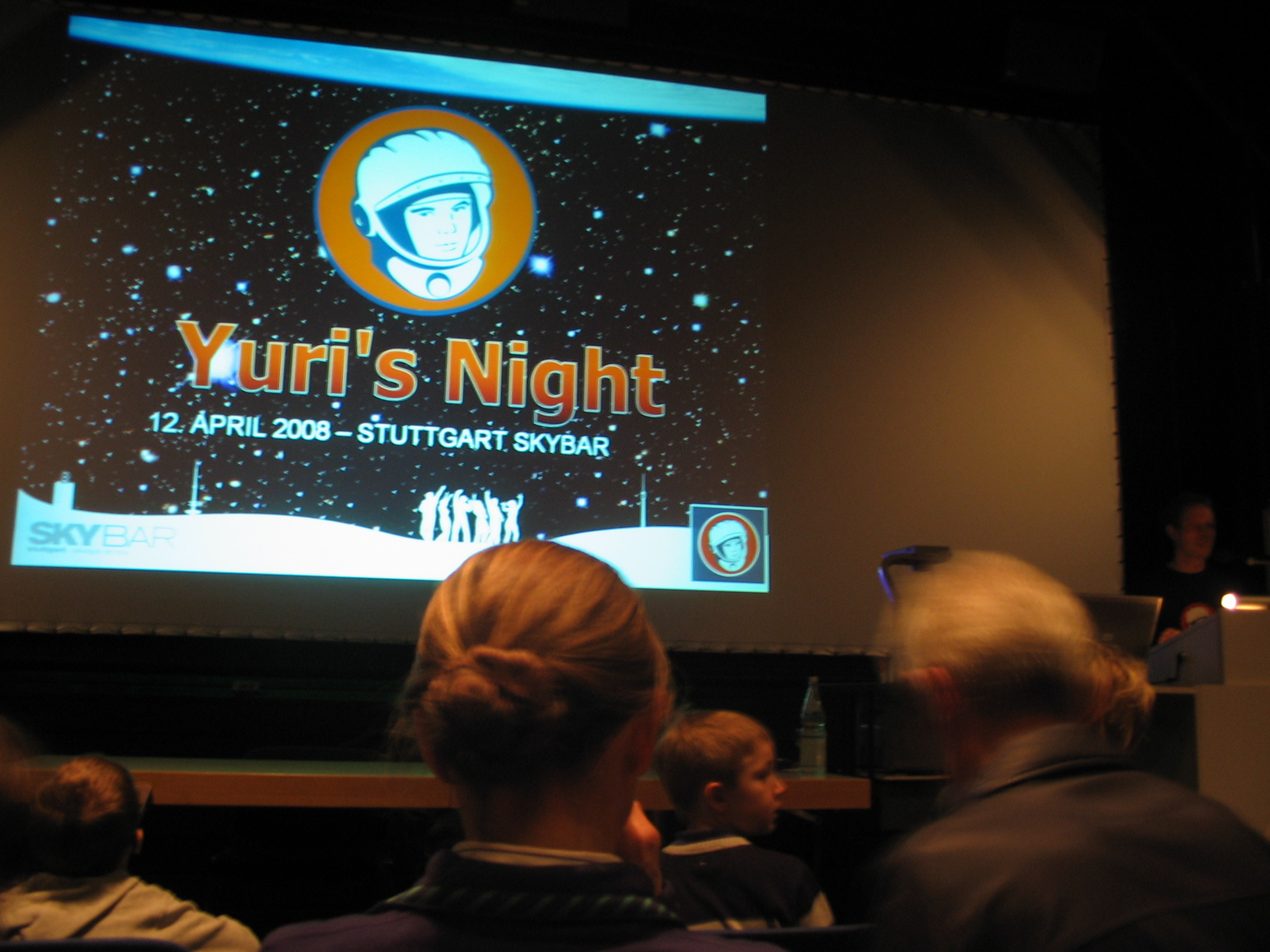
Yuri's Night 2008 celebration at the Stuttgart planetarium

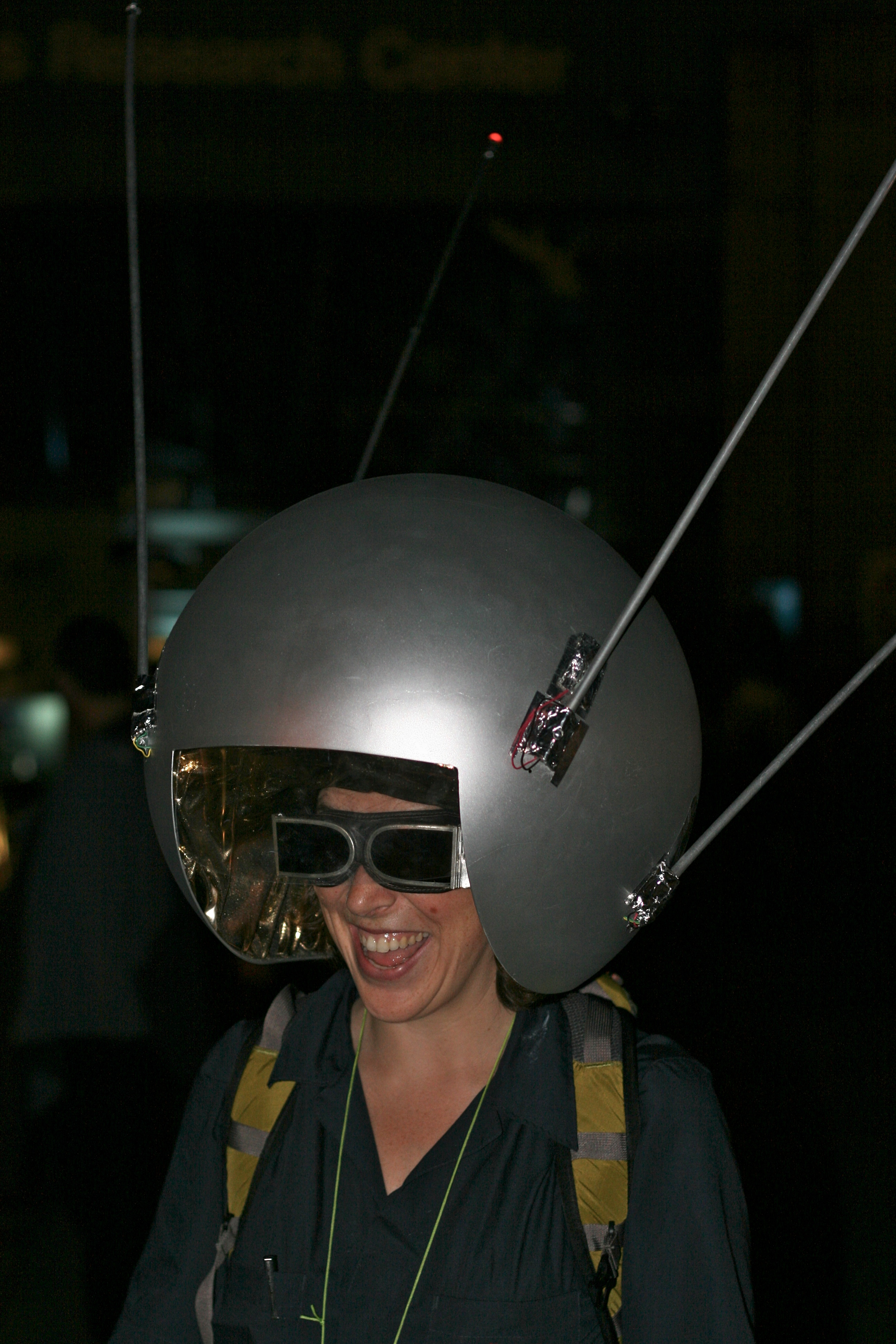
Yuri's Night 2008 celebration in Mountain View, California

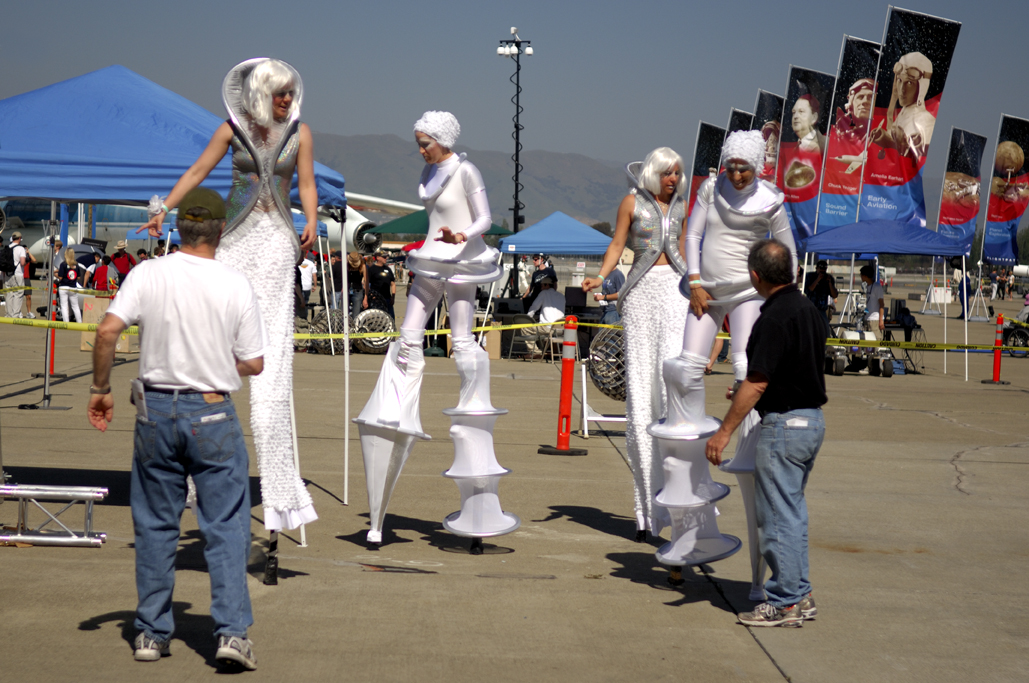
Yuri's Night 2008 celebration in San Francisco Bay Area

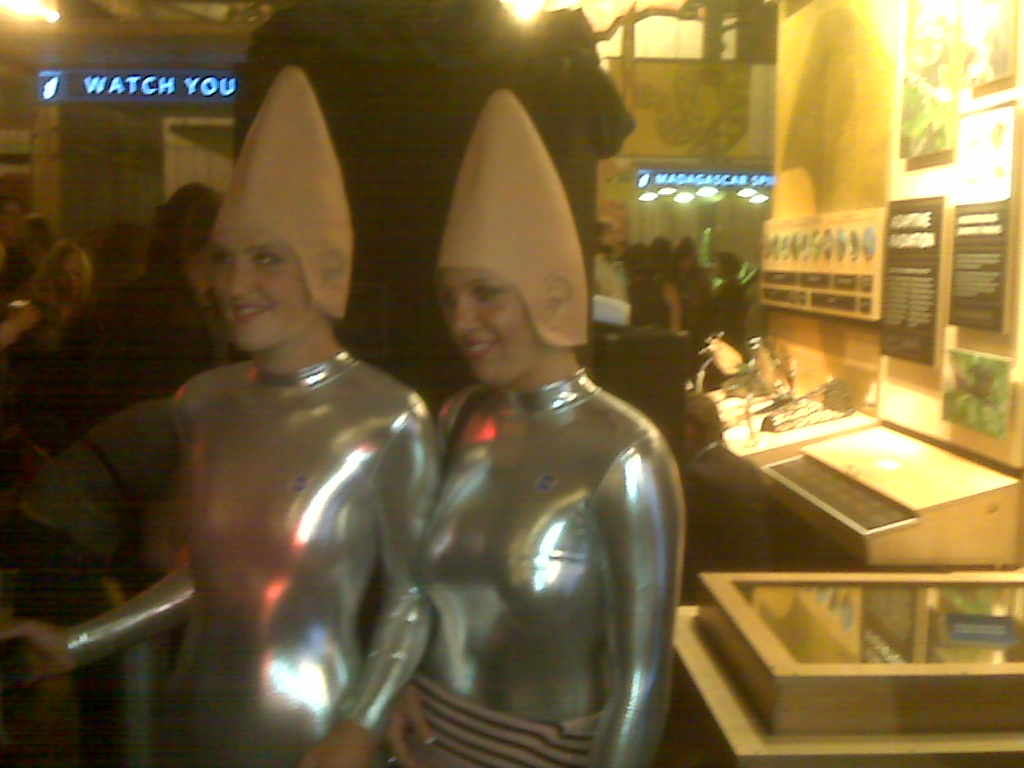
Yuri's Night 2009 celebration at the California Academy of Sciences

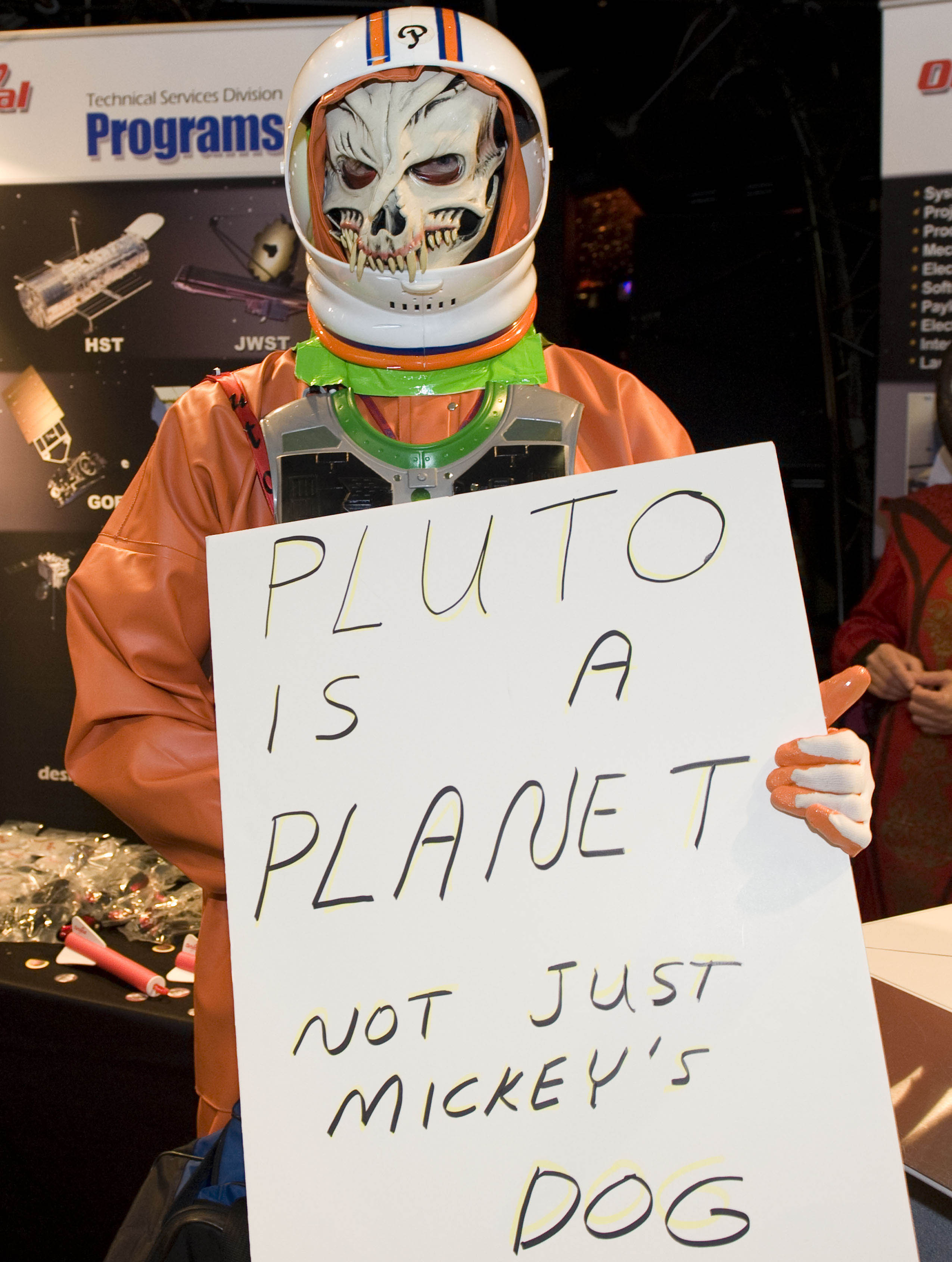
Yuri's Night 2010 celebration at the Goddard Space Flight Center, the sign on the astronaut reads "Pluto is a planet, not just Mickey's dog"

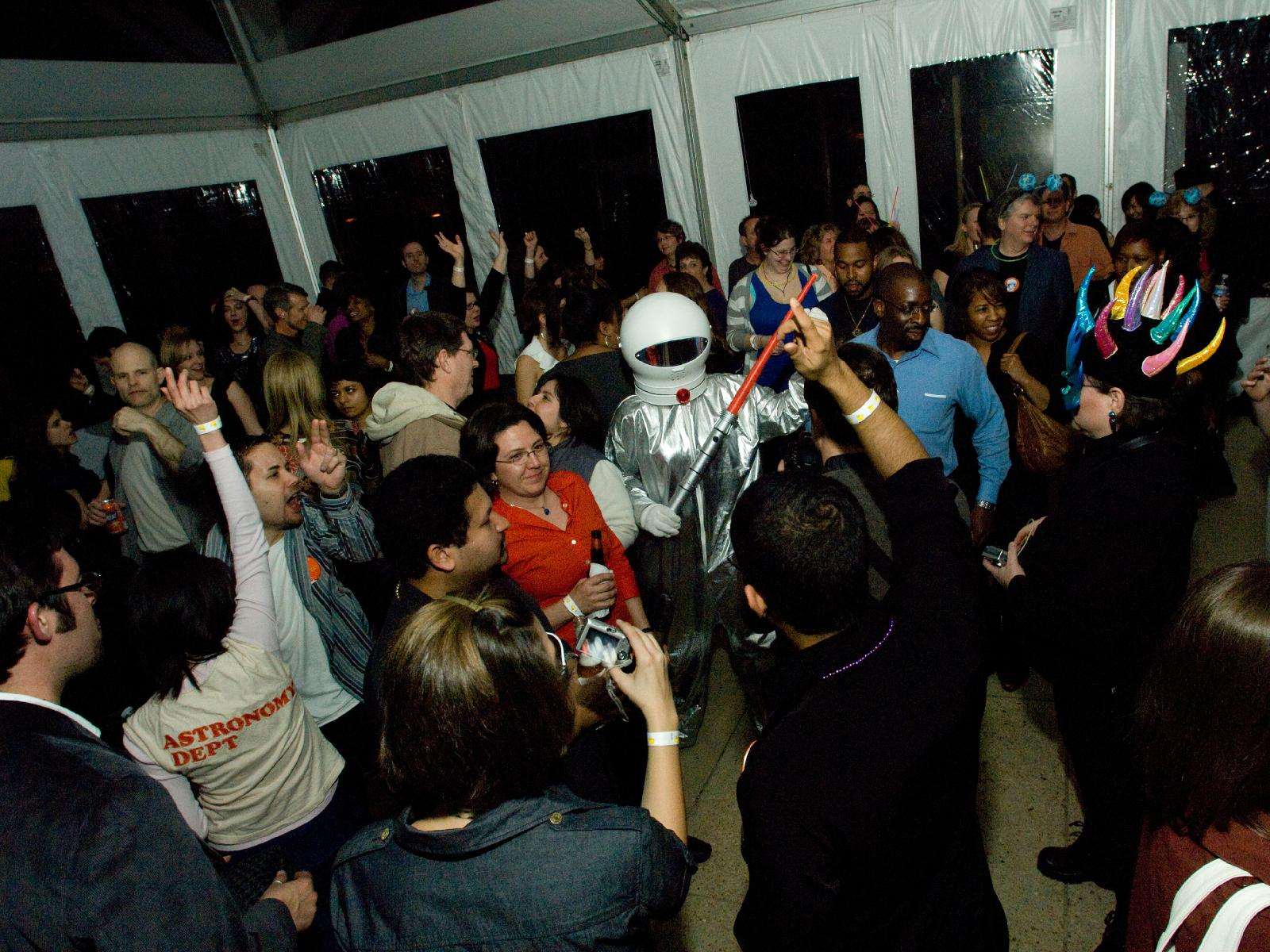
Yuri's Night 2011 celebration at the Goddard Space Flight Center

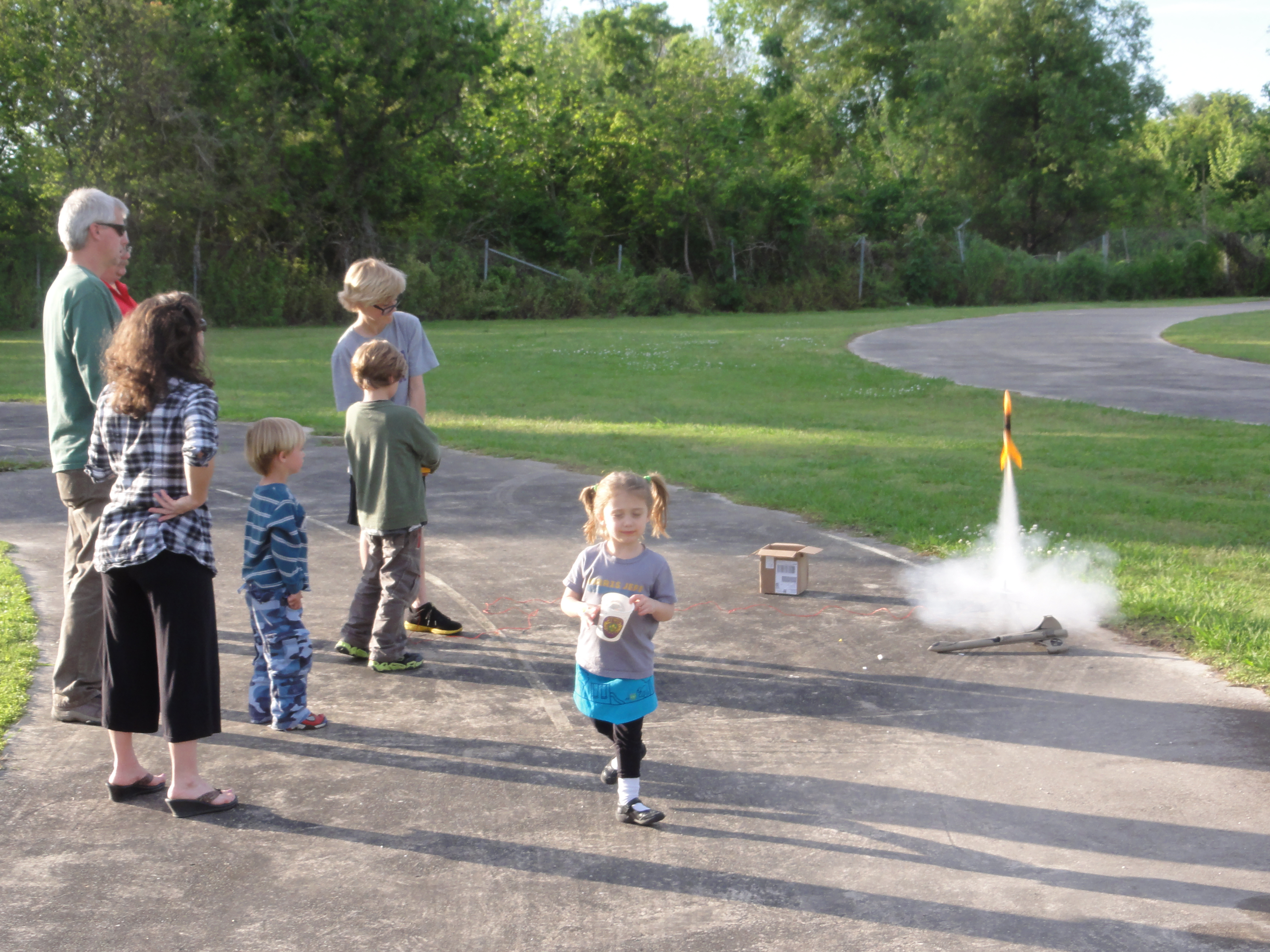
A model rocket launch celebrating Yuri's Day 2013 in City Park, New Orleans

== See also ==
- International Day of Human Space Flight
- World Space Week
