= Ralf Little =

English actor, writer, former semi-professional footballer

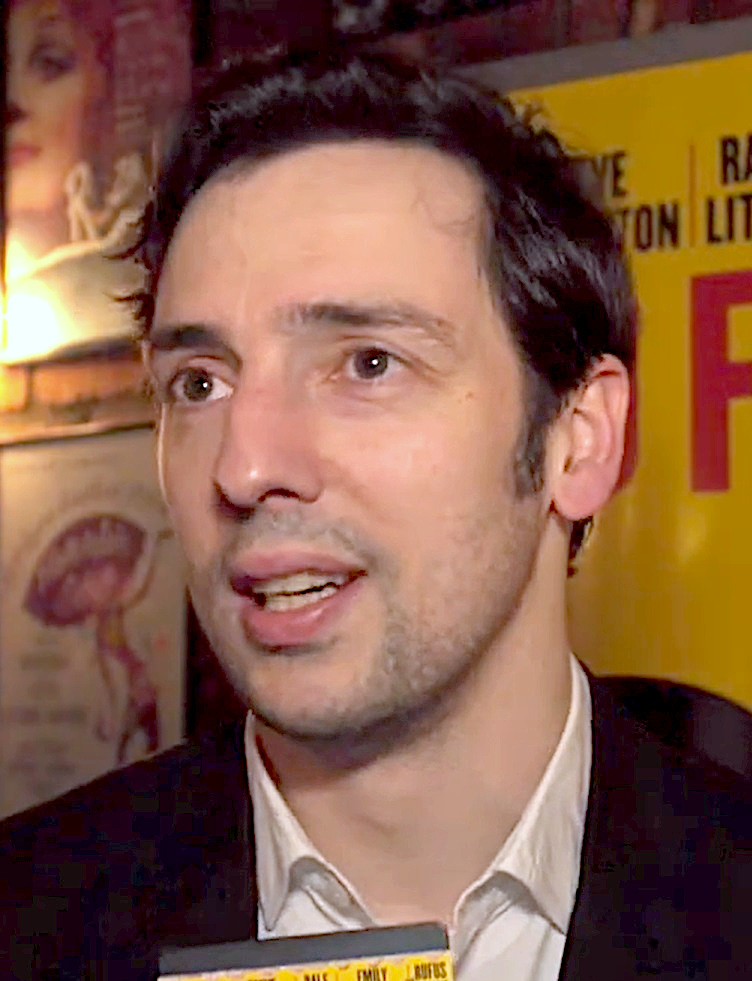
- Little at Dead Funny in 2016
- Born: Ralf Alastair John Little; 8 February 1980 (age 46); Oldham, Greater Manchester, England
- Occupations: Actor; writer; footballer; presenter; narrator
- Years active: 1994–present
- Partner: Lindsey Ferrentino (2018-2024)
- Family: Albert Lockley (great-grandfather)
Association football career
- Position: Midfielder
Senior career*
Years	Team	Apps	(Gls)
2002–2003	Staines Town		
2003	Maidstone United		
2004	Edgware Town		
2005–2006	Windsor & Eton		
2007–2008	Chertsey Town		
2008	Stone Dominoes		
International career
2012–2013	Sealand	3	(0)
- * Club domestic league appearances and goals

Ralf Alastair John Little (born 8 February 1980) is an English actor, writer, presenter, narrator and former semi-professional footballer. He has worked mainly in television comedy, including playing Antony Royle in The Royle Family (1998–2000, 2006, 2009–2010) and Jonny Keogh in the first six series of Two Pints of Lager and a Packet of Crisps (2001–2006). He was the narrator of Channel 5's documentary series Our Yorkshire Farm (2018–2022) as well as the spin-offs, Beyond The Yorkshire Farm: Reuben and Clive and Reuben: Life in the Dales. From 2020 to 2024, he starred as Detective Inspector Neville Parker in Death in Paradise.

== Early life and education ==
Ralf Alastair John Little was born in February 1980 in Oldham and attended Bolton School (Boys' Division) and later living in Whitefield near Bury. His younger brother, Ross Little, is also an actor and played Michael Gilder in Born and Bred. Their parents are accountants.

In 1998, Little abandoned his studies at the University of Manchester medical school in order to concentrate on his acting career.

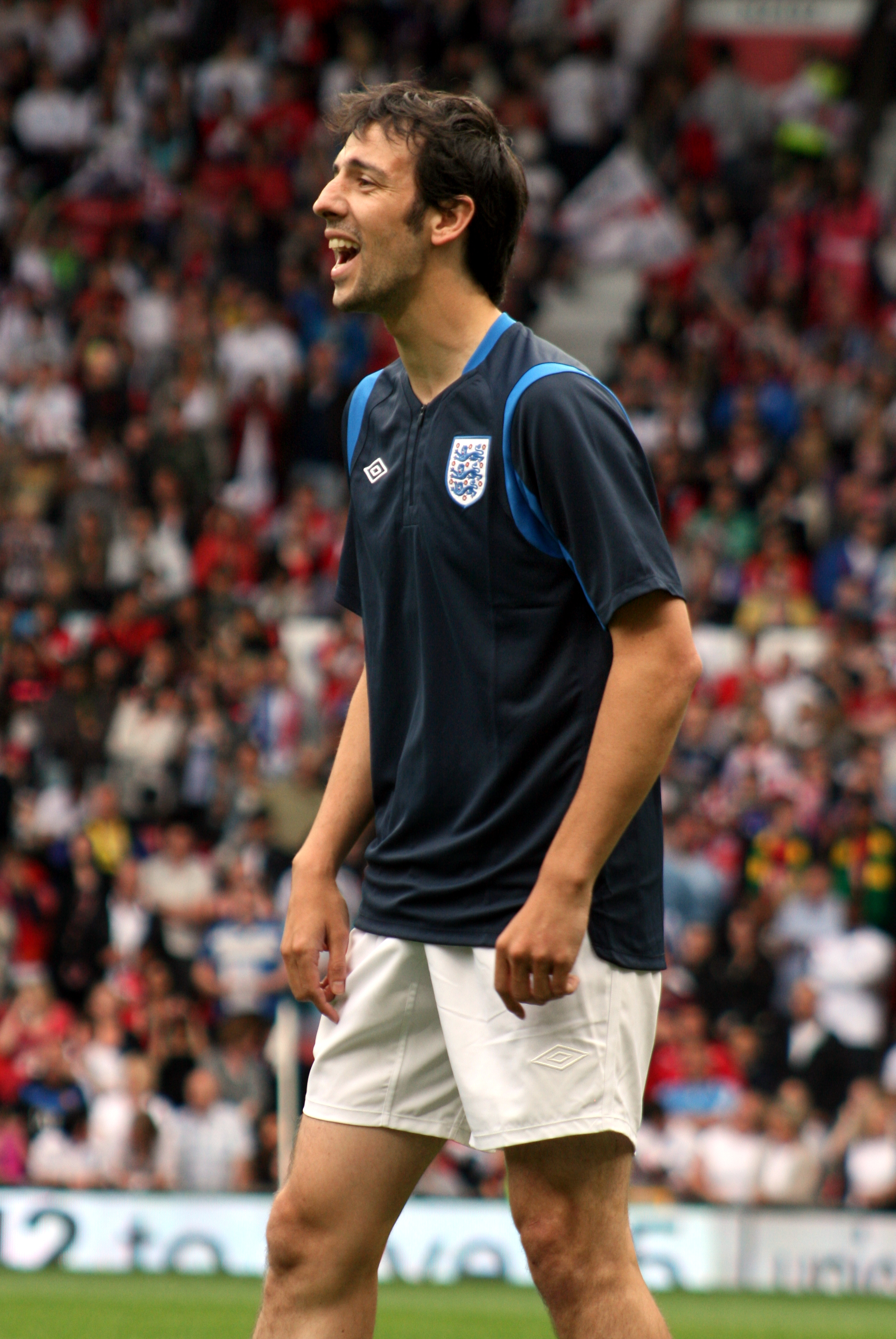
Little at Soccer Aid in 2010

== Career ==
Some of his early television roles included minor roles in various programmes such as Elidor, Children's Ward and Sloggers. Little's big break came when he was offered the role of Antony Royle in the BBC sitcom The Royle Family. Little appeared in the show's original run from September 1998 to December 2000, before returning in three of the show's five Christmas specials, broadcast in 2006, 2009 and 2010.

In 2001, he was cast in a main role as Jonny Keogh for six series of Two Pints of Lager and a Packet of Crisps. During an interview for This Morning in September 2007, Little said that he would not be returning for the next series due to an overwhelming schedule, and his character was subsequently killed off.

In 1999, Little played the Star of Bethlehem in the ITV comedy drama The Flint Street Nativity and appeared in a minor role in Granada TVs Coronation Street in January 1999 as care home assistant Mark Stranks.

In December 2000, Little played Wishee Washee in the ITV Panto Aladdin, which was filmed in the New Wimbledon Theatre.

In 2001, he played the young George Harrison in Presence at the Royal Court Theatre, for which he was nominated for an Olivier Award for his performance. In 2004, he played the title character in Billy Liar at the Theatre Royal in Windsor. He appeared in Juliet McKoen's 2005 ghost story/murder mystery film Frozen, set in Fleetwood, Lancashire. Between November 2002 and January 2003, he hosted 17 one-hour-long episodes of The Ralf Little Show on BBC Choice.

Other film credits include 24 Hour Party People (playing Joy Division and New Order bass player Peter Hook) and Al's Lads. Little also starred as Stephen, alongside Anne-Marie Duff, in Roger Goldby's film, The Waiting Room, released throughout the UK in June 2008. In television, he also appeared in Paradise Heights.

In August 2007, he released his first online novel (co-written with Stephen Morris), The Golden Generation, a coming of age tale about a recently single man who is taken under the wings of two city traders who show him the trappings of big money in the big city but that it comes at a price. Money taken from the sale of the novel went to the charity Shelter. He was a cast member of KateModern, a web series developed by the creators of the US YouTube hit lonelygirl15, which started in July 2007 and posted its final video in June 2008.

In July 2008, he appeared in 50 Ways to Leave Your Lover, a new play at the Bush Theatre which was revised as 50 Ways to Leave Your Lover at Christmas. In September of the same year, he starred in Massive, a BBC comedy about an indie record label. Also in 2008, Little became the narrator of Monkey Life, and the second series of Last Man Standing. In 2009, he played Clint in Married Single Other, alongside Miranda Raison He also worked on the film Powder. In the autumn of 2010, he starred in The Aliens, a British premiere of a new play by Annie Baker, again at the Bush Theatre. In 2011, he appeared as Richard Dickens in the comedy series The Café, shown on Sky 1, which he co-wrote with Michelle Terry.

In 2013, he made a guest appearance in Death in Paradise (series two, episode six), and appeared at the Liverpool Playhouse as the father of a girl with cerebral palsy, in a production of A Day in the Death of Joe Egg.

In 2014, he appeared in the TV series Our Zoo. He also voiced Captain Skip in The Unbeatables, the English version of Argentine animated film Foosball.

He appeared as the character Steadfast in "Smile", the second episode of the 10th series of the BBC1 series Doctor Who in 2017.

In August 2018, Little starred as "Alan" in God of Carnage at the Theatre Royal, Bath.

In October 2019, he was confirmed as the new lead in Death in Paradise, returning to the series as a new character, DI Neville Parker, six years after his one-episode guest appearance.

In May 2020, Little, alongside his Royle Family co-star Ricky Tomlinson, presented a six-part travel series titled Ricky & Ralf's Very Northern Road Trip for Gold.

He confirmed a partnership with St. Lucia Distillers and their Chairman's Reserve rum brand, becoming an ambassador for 2023-24.

In 2026, he played the lead role of Alec Leamas in a production of John Le Carré's The Spy Who Came in from the Cold, which toured the UK between March and August, starting at the Churchill Theatre, Bromley.

== Football career ==
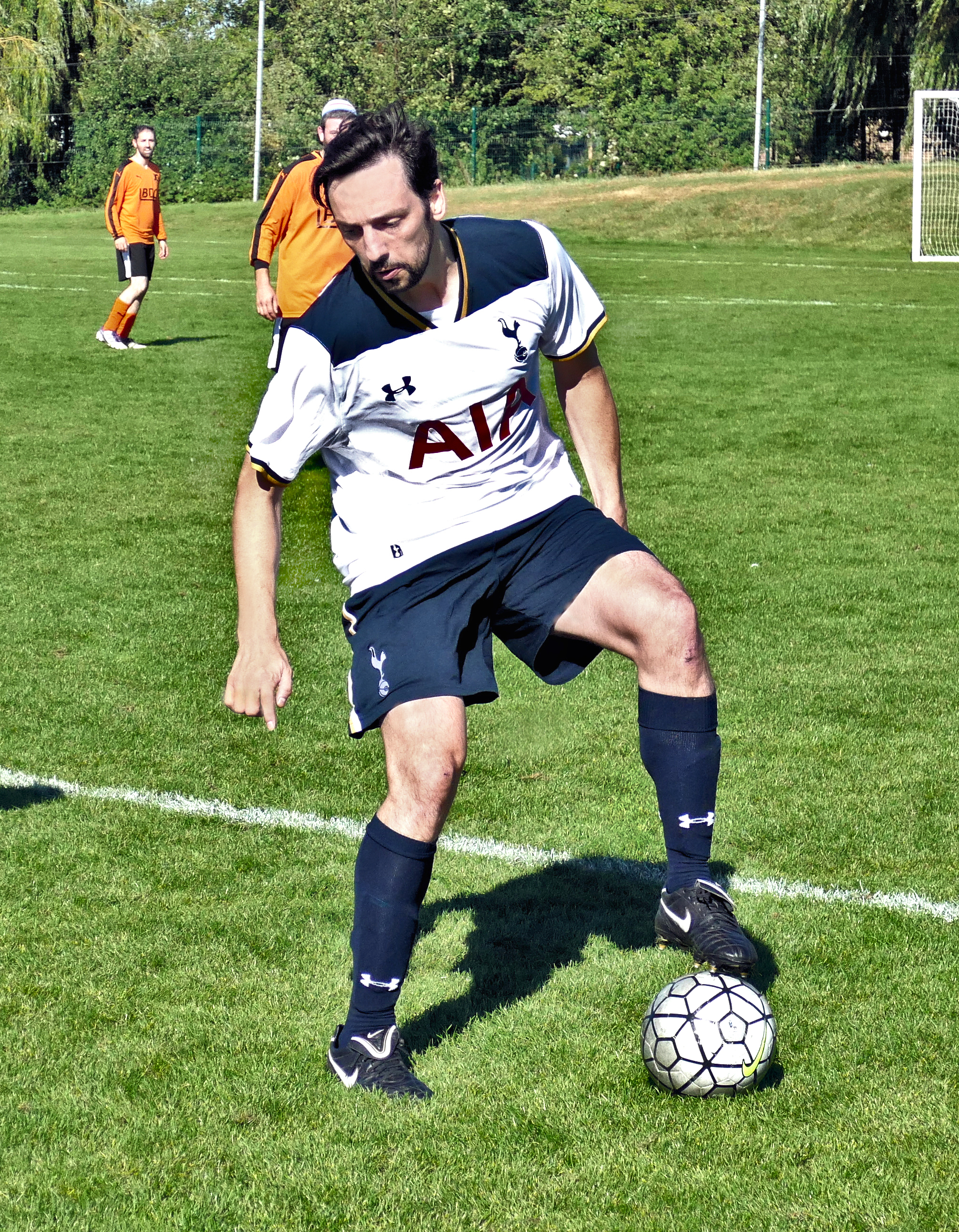
Little playing in a charity match, September 2016

Little, a supporter of Manchester United, is a keen footballer and has played for a number of semi-professional clubs when other commitments allow. In March 2003, he played for Maidstone United against Wimbledon, having previously been training with Staines Town. He joined Isthmian League side Edgware Town in October 2004, making his debut in the FA Vase game against Waltham Abbey.

He played for Chertsey Town during the 2007–08 season and on 8 July 2008 signed for North West Counties League side Stone Dominoes. He has also played celebrity football matches for charity on a few occasions and played with members of Hollywood United while in the district for acting career purposes. He also plays for the Arsenal Ex-Pro and Celebrity XI. On 6 June 2010, he participated in a Soccer Aid game for England on the left wing.

On 9 August 2011, he played in the John Kennedy testimonial match for Manchester United against Celtic which resulted in a 5–2 win for Celtic.

In May 2012, he appeared for the Sealand national football team in a match against the Chagos Islands as captain. The match was held at the grounds of Godalming Town. In August 2012 and March 2013 he played in two games against Alderney, a 1–1 draw and 2–1 win respectively.

On 2 September 2017, he played in the Game 4 Grenfell match at Loftus Road, with the match proceeds going to the Grenfell disaster appeal.

== Personal life ==
Little's great-grandfather, Albert Lockley, was a Welsh international footballer who played for Chirk.

He had been engaged to American playwright and screenwriter Lindsey Ferrentino, daughter of comedian and magician John Ferrentino since 2018. They reportedly split up in 2024.

Little identifies as a humanist. He was appointed a patron of the humanist charity Humanists UK in 2020.

== Filmography ==
=== Film ===
Year	Title	Role	Notes
2002	24 Hour Party People	Hooky (Peter Hook)	
2002	Al's Lads	Dan	Also known as Capone's Boys
2004	Fat Slags	Milkman	
2005	Frozen	Eddie	
2005	Zemanovaload	Kev	
2007	The Waiting Room	Stephen	
2008	Telstar: The Joe Meek Story	Chas Hodges	
2011	Life of the Party	Jason	Short film
2011	The Itch of the Golden Nit	Fireboy (voice)	Short film
2011	Powder	Syd	
2012	Get Lucky	Miles	Short film
2013	The Unbeatables	Captain Skip (voice, UK dub)	Also known as Metagol, Underdogs and Foosball
2014	Nativity 3: Dude, Where's My Donkey?!	Charlie Ford (Sophie's brother)	
2017	National Theatre Live: Ugly Lies the Bone	Stevie	

=== Television ===
Year	Title	Role	Notes
1994–1995	Sloggers	Scooby	7 episodes
1995	Heartbeat	Eddie Tinniswood	Episode: "Vigilante"
1995	Elidor	Morris Dancer's Son	2 episodes: "#1.1" and "#1.4"
1998	The Ward	Robbie	Episode: "#10.11"
1998–2010	The Royle Family	Antony Royle	Main role. 22 episodes
1999	Coronation Street	Mark Stranks	3 episodes
1999	City Central	Dave	Episode: "Life, Liberty and Pursuit"
1999	Bostock's Cup	Norman Lewis	Television film
1999	The Flint Street Nativity	Clive Cattle / Star of Bethlehem	Television film
1999	Heartbeat	Julian	Episode: "Fire and Ashes"
2000	Monkey Trousers	Various characters	
2000	Always and Everyone	Frankie	2 episodes: "Outbreak" and "The Darkest Corners"
2000	Aladdin	Wishee Washee	Television film
2000–2020	Soccer AM	Himself	7 episodes
2001	The Bill	Tommy Lawson	3 episodes
2001	Is Harry on the Boat?	Trevor	Television film
2001–2006	Two Pints of Lager and a Packet of Crisps	Jonny Keogh	Main role. 56 episodes
2002	North Face	Paul	Television short film
2002	The Ralf Little Show	Himself - Presenter	17 episodes
2002–2003	Paradise Heights / The Eustace Bros.	Richard Eustace	Main role. 12 episodes
2004	The Comic Side of 7 Days	Narrator	
2006	Brief Encounters	Simon	Mini-series. Episode: "Small Things"
2007	Heartbeat	Stephen Lansbury	Episode: "Seeds of Destruction"
2007	KateModern	Gavin Taylore	
2007	Robin Hood	Joseph	Episode: "The Angel of Death"
2008	Last Man Standing	Narrator	10 episodes
2008	Massive	Danny Stewart	6 episodes
2008	Marple	Sergeant Pickford	Episode: "A Pocketful of Rye"
2008–2019	Monkey Life	Narrator	200 episodes
2010	Married Single Other	Clint	6 episodes
2011	Little Crackers	Colin Smith	Episode: "Sheridan Smith's Little Cracker: The Daltons"
2011–2013	The Café	Richard Dickens	Main role. 13 episodes
2013	Death in Paradise	Will Teague	Episode: "A Dash of Sunshine"
2014	Our Zoo	Billy Atkinson	Mini-series. 6 episodes
2014	First Dates	Narrator	8 episodes
2015	Drunk History	'Colonel' Thomas Blood	Episode: "Blackbeard / Colonel Blood / Henry VIII"
2015	The Interceptor	Alex	Mini-series. Episode: "#1.6"
2015	Lewis	Sean Wilkinson	2 episodes: "One for Sorrow: Parts 1 & 2"
2016	The Girl Whisperer	Sam	3 episodes
2016	Midsomer Murders	Jared Horton	Episode: "Saints and Sinners"
2016	Hoff the Record	Barman	Episode: "Wedding"
2016–2017	Borderline	Narrator / Barry the Plumber	Main role. 12 episodes
2016–2020	The A Word	Stuart	4 episodes
2017	We Have Been Watching	Himself	5 episodes
2017	Doctor Who	Steadfast	Episode: "Smile"
2018–2022	Our Yorkshire Farm	Narrator	32 episodes
2020	Inside No. 9	Phil	Episode: "The Referee's a W***er"
2020	Ricky & Ralf's Very Northern Road Trip	Himself	6 episodes
2020–2024	Death in Paradise	DI Neville Parker	Main role. 39 episodes (as of 24 March 2024)
2021–2022	It's Me or the Dog	Narrator	Series 5 & 6, 30 episodes
2022–2023	Beyond the Yorkshire Farm: Reuben & Clive	Narrator	4 episodes
2023	Beyond Paradise	DI Neville Parker	Episode: "#1.6"
2024	Inside No. 9	Party guest	Episode: "Plodding On"
2024	Reuben: Life in the Dales	Narrator	6 episodes
2024	Will & Ralf Should Know Better	Himself	10 episodes
2026	Hunting Alice Bell	Graham Hunter	Mini-series

== Awards and nominations ==
Year	Award	Work	Result	Ref
2017	Los Angeles Web Series Festival Best Web Comedy	The Girl Whisperer	Nominated	
2020	TV Times Award for Favourite Actor	Death in Paradise	Nominated	
2021	TV Times Award for Favourite Actor	Death in Paradise	Nominated	
