= Loftus Road =

Stadium in Shepherd's Bush, London, England

Loftus Road Stadium
- The Loft
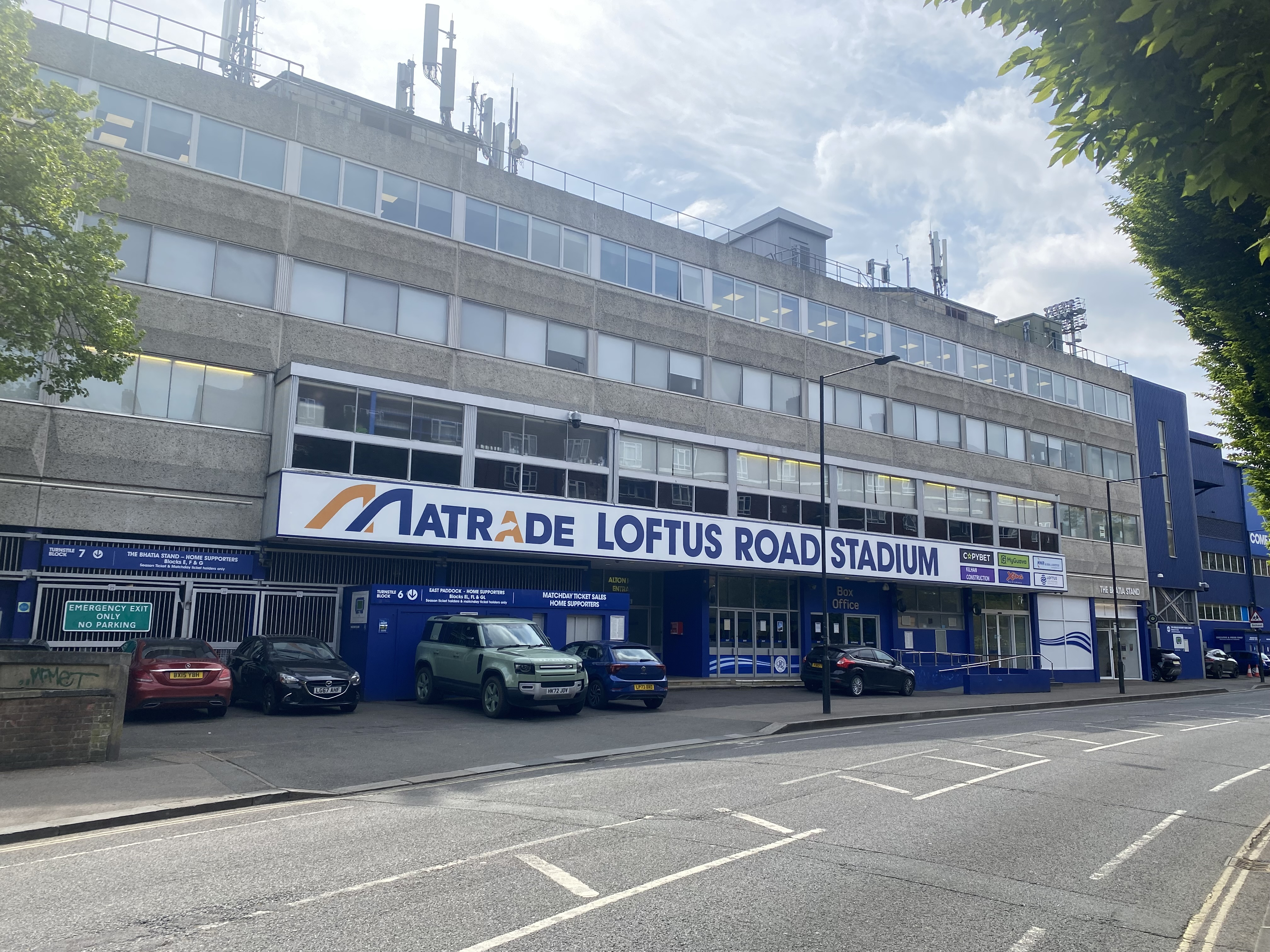
- Loftus Road in 2025
- Interactive map of Loftus Road Stadium
- Full name: Loftus Road Stadium
- Former names: Kiyan Prince Foundation Stadium (2019–2022)
- Address: South Africa Road
- Location: Shepherd's Bush; London, England; W12 7PJ
- Coordinates: 51°30′33″N 0°13′56″W
- Owner: Queens Park Rangers Football & Athletic Club Ltd
- Capacity: 18,439
- Surface: Grass
- Scoreboard: Electronic
- Record attendance: 35,353 including standing (Queens Park Rangers v. Leeds United, 27 April 1974); 19,002 all-seated (Queens Park Rangers v. Manchester City, 6 November 1999)
- Field size: 112 by 72 yards (102 by 66 m)
- Public transit: White City; Wood Lane; Shepherd's Bush; Shepherd's Bush Market

Construction
- Built: 1904
- Opened: 1904

Tenants
- Shepherd's Bush FC (1904–1915); Queens Park Rangers (1917–1931, 1933–1962, 1963–present); London Wasps (Guinness Premiership) (1996–2002); Fulham (2002–2004); AFC Wimbledon (2020)

Loftus Road, known for sponsorship reasons as MATRADE Loftus Road Stadium, is a football stadium in Shepherd's Bush, West London, Greater London, England, which is home to Queens Park Rangers Football Club, with a capacity of 18,439.

In 1981, it became the first stadium in British professional football to have an artificial pitch of Omniturf installed. This remained in use until 1988, after which a natural grass pitch was reintroduced.

Rugby union team London Wasps shared the ground with QPR between 1996 and 2002 and Premier League football club Fulham shared it from 2002 to 2004 while Craven Cottage was closed for reconstruction. AFC Wimbledon started the 2020–2021 season sharing the ground while they waited for their new stadium in Merton to be finished. Other users of the stadium have included the Jamaican and Australian national football teams. In 1985, Barry McGuigan defeated Eusebio Pedroza for the World Boxing Association featherweight championship at the stadium.

On 7 June 2019, the club gifted the naming rights to the stadium to The Kiyan Prince Foundation, a charity set up in honour of former QPR youth player Kiyan Prince, resulting in the stadium becoming known as the Kiyan Prince Foundation Stadium. On 25 May 2022, the club announced that the stadium name would revert to Loftus Road ahead of the 2022–23 season.

On 26 October 2023, the club announced that it had signed a three-year agreement to sell the naming rights of the stadium to MATRADE; thus Loftus Road will be known as the "MATRADE Loftus Road Stadium" until the 2025–26 season.

== History ==
The ground was first used on 11 October 1904 by Shepherd's Bush, an amateur side that was disbanded during the First World War. QPR moved to Loftus Road in 1917, having had their ground at Park Royal commandeered by the army in February 1915. At that time the ground was an open field with a pavilion. One stand from Park Royal was dismantled and re-erected in 1919, forming the Ellerslie Road stand. This stand was the only covered seating in the ground until 1968 and was replaced in 1972. It had a capacity of 2,950.

QPR moved out of Loftus Road at the start of the 1931–32 season, moving to nearby White City Stadium, but after a loss of £7,000, the team moved back for the start of the 1933–34 season. In 1938, a new covered terrace for 6,000 spectators was constructed by a company called Framed Structures Ltd at the Loftus Road end, taking the overall ground capacity up to 30,000. It cost £7,000 (with £1,500 donated by the QPR Supporters Club) and was opened by Herbert Morrison, the leading Labour MP and future wartime Home Secretary, at the match against Crystal Palace on 29 October. The covered section of the terracing was concreted at that time; the uncovered section was concreted in 1945.

In April 1948, after winning the Third Division (South) championship, the club bought the freehold of the stadium plus 39 houses in Loftus Road and Ellerslie Road for £26,250, financed by a share flotation that raised £30,000. When the club's finances were under pressure in the late 1950s the houses had to be sold. On 5 October 1953 floodlights were used at Loftus Road for the first time for a friendly game against Arsenal. In summer 1966 the original floodlights were replaced by much taller floodlight pylons. In summer 1980 these in turn were replaced with new floodlights.

QPR experimented once again with a move to White City Stadium in the 1962–63 season, but moved back to Loftus Road once more after less than one full season. In the summer of 1968 the South Africa Road stand was constructed at a cost of £150,000 to replace the old open terracing. In 1972 a new stand was completed in Ellerslie Road, replacing the tin-roofed grandstand erected in 1919, and first used in the match against Oxford United on 2 December 1972. The changing rooms and offices were moved to South Africa Road and the television gantry moved in the other direction.

The stadium's highest recorded attendance of 35,353 was in a game against Leeds United on 27 April 1974. The following summer the paddock of the South Africa Road stand was converted from terracing to seating with the installation of 4,600 seats, thus lowering the capacity of the stadium to the 31,002 present for the last home match of the 1975/6 season against Leeds United on 24 April 1976.

During the summer of 1981 an artificial pitch of Omniturf was installed at Loftus Road, the first such surface to be used in British professional football. The surface was not favoured by everyone, with QPR keeper Peter Hucker describing it as "basically a bit of carpet over two feet of concrete", and stated that as a goalkeeper, he strongly disliked diving onto it saying that "I'd have close to third degree burns because the pitch would totally rip the skin off." Rangers lost the first league match played on the new surface 1-2 versus Luton Town on 1 September 1981. During the time that Loftus Road had the Omniturf pitch installed, QPR reached two cup finals and became Second Division champions, something that critics claimed was caused by the advantage the pitch presented, and QPR's home games in the 1984–85 UEFA Cup were played at Arsenal's Highbury Stadium. It was claimed that manager Terry Venables would let opposition teams train on the pitch when it was dry, and then deliberately dampen the pitch so that the ball played differently to what they expected at kick off. It was removed in April 1988 because of football legislation and replaced with grass. There were just three other league stadiums in the whole country with a plastic pitch, and by 1994 all of these had been ripped up.

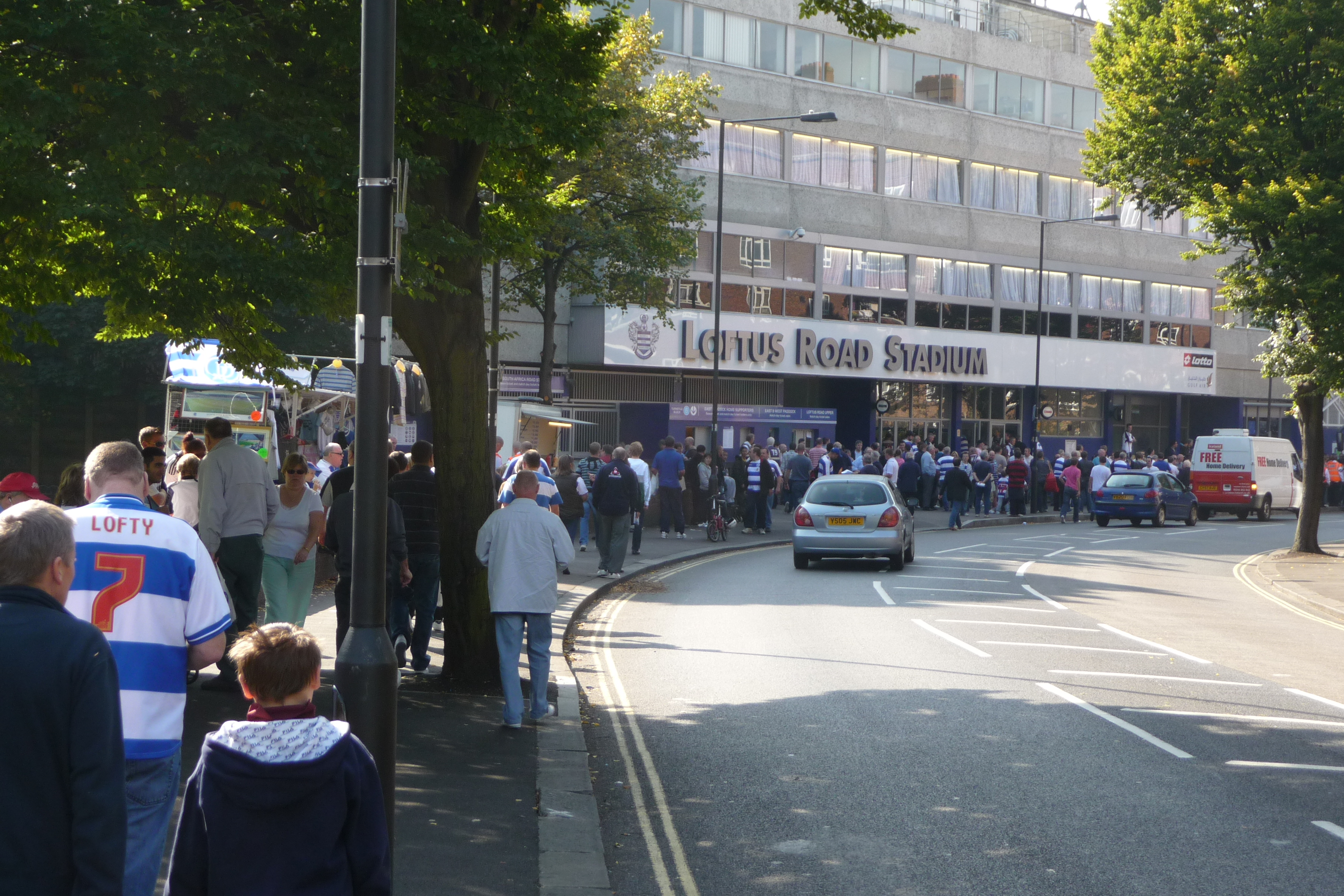
Loftus Road Stadium, South Africa Road entrance in 2008

New stands were opened at the School End in the summer of 1980 and one year later at the Loftus Road end. At the same time as the new Loftus Road stand was built executive boxes were installed in the lower tier of the South Africa Road stand and the artificial pitch laid. The stadium capacity at this time was 27,000 and it was one of the most modern and advanced stadiums in Britain having been completely reconstructed over a 13-year period from 1968 to 1981. Between the summer of 1994 and the start of 2022–23 season; Loftus Road ground was an all-seater stadium with the construction of seating in the lower Loftus Road stand. The last match where home spectators were able to watch the match from terracing was on 16 April 1994 against Everton. Standing returned to Loftus Road in 2022 when the club introduced rail seating in the ML, NL & PL blocks in the Lower Loft and the R Block in the Stanley Bowles Stand.

The owning company, also called Loftus Road, of QPR, London Wasps and the stadium itself, went into the red in the late 1990s only a couple of seasons after it was formed in 1996. In 2001, there were concerns that Queens Park Rangers and the stadium would need to be sold separately when the club went into administration. There was interest from commercial buyers and housing developers. A supporter's trust was set up to keep the club at Loftus Road, and to fight the suggested move out of the stadium and to Milton Keynes. One further suggestion was a merger between QPR and fellow London club Wimbledon, with the newly merged club playing at Loftus Road, but this idea was abandoned following the response from supporters. A £1 million payment by QPR's long time local rivals Fulham in 2002 helped to alleviate the financial problems in return for a ground sharing agreement while Craven Cottage was developed.

Loftus Road briefly became home to non-league football club Yeading as they faced Premiership club Newcastle United in the third round of the 2005 FA Cup. The decision was made as Yeading felt that their home stadium could not suitably segregate the fans. Despite holding out for fifty minutes, Yeading went on to lose the match, 2–0.

In a fundraiser for the Grenfell Tower fire, which happened on 14 June 2017, Loftus Road stadium hosted a special match – appropriately named 'Game 4 Grenfell' – for the people who died. Celebrities participating included Olly Murs, Sir Mo Farah and many more. This took place on 2 September 2017.

On 7 June 2019, following nominations and a fan vote from a shortlist, it was announced that Loftus Road Stadium would be renamed the 'Kiyan Prince Foundation Stadium' in honour of the former QPR youth team member Kiyan Prince who was fatally stabbed in 2006.

In December 2021, it was announced that the Ellerslie Road Stand would be renamed the Stanley Bowles Stand. In February 2022 the club announced a fundraising campaign, asking supporters to pay for the planned renaming costs.

Ahead of the 2022–23 season, the club installed just under 1000 rail seats in the ML, NL & PL blocks in the Lower Loft and the R Block in the Stanley Bowles Stand and the upper tier of the School End stand used by visiting supporters.

In mid 2023 the old "Blue and White Club" bar in the Lower Loftus Road stand was renamed the "Forever Rs bar", after the former players, managers and coaches association that had been created in 2016. The bar contains memorabilia donated by both fans and the club and is used to host talks with former players and other fan related events. It also lists all of the more than 100 former players, managers and coaches inducted to "Forever Rs" since its creation.

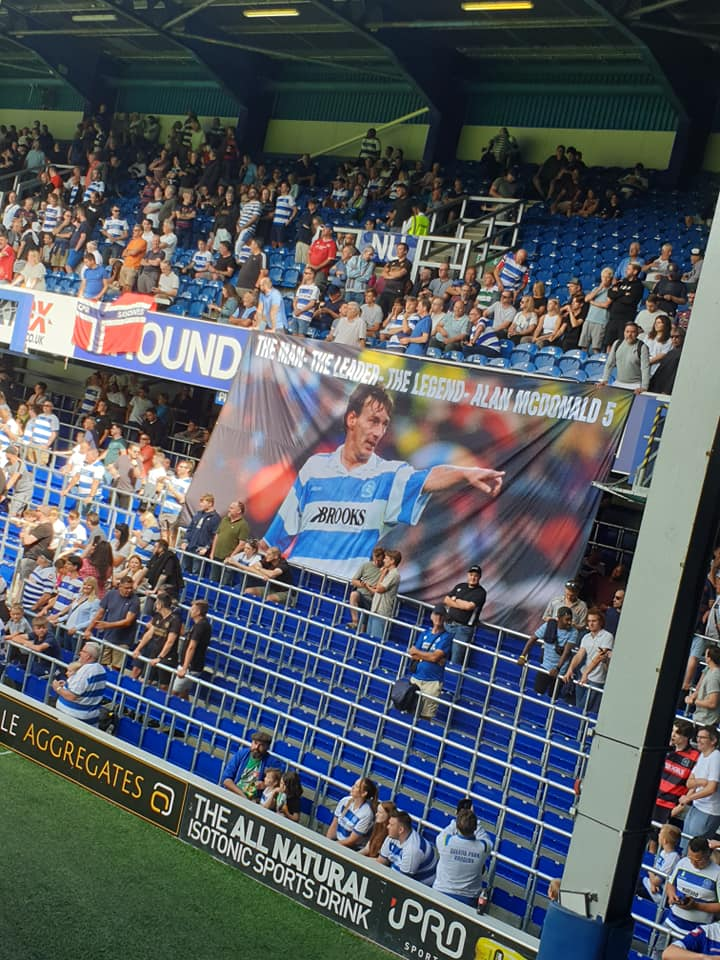
Rail seating in the lower loft

=== The future ===
Following a number of years of uncertainty about whether the club would expand the capacity of the stadium, or relocate to a new site in the event of a return to the Premier League, chairman Tony Fernandes announced, on 28 November 2011, that the club was investigating the possibility of relocating to a new site in West London in order to build a larger stadium. The current capacity of the stadium is 18,439.

It was not the first time that an owner had suggested moving out of Loftus Road, with director Antonio Caliendo suggesting, in March 2006, a potential site for a new shopping and leisure development near the BBC Television Centre, and then QPR manager, Luigi De Canio, suggesting in 2008 that the team needed to leave the stadium in order to fulfil its ambitions.

In August 2013, QPR started discussions with Hammersmith and Fulham Council about moving into a new stadium, believed to be at Old Oak Common, and soon after, in December, confirmed that they would be leaving Loftus Road for the short move across west London. However, in July 2014, those plans suffered a setback, with the current tenants at Old Oak – Car Giant – suggesting the club's plans were "speculative and presumptuous". The new stadium was planned to be called New Queens Park.

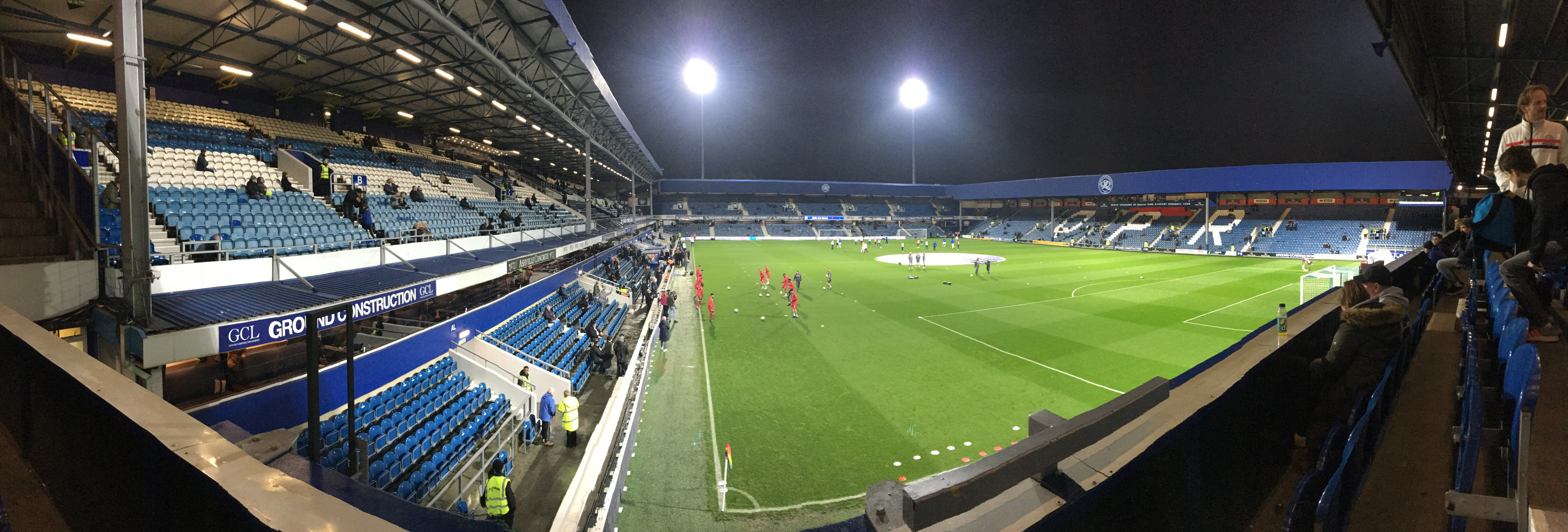
Loftus Road before a game against Nottingham Forest in 2019

=== Naming history ===
- 1904–2019: Loftus Road Stadium
- 2019–2022: Kiyan Prince Foundation Stadium
- 2022–2023: Loftus Road Stadium
- 2023–present: MATRADE Loftus Road Stadium

== Structures and facilities ==
The stadium has a capacity of 18,439. The four stands are the Loftus Engineering Stand (often shortened to The Loft), The Stanley Bowles Stand, The Bhatia Stand and the Achilleus Security Stand, the Upper Tier of which is used by away supporters.

Because of the size of the stadium, supporters find themselves much closer to the pitch compared to many other stadiums. All four of the modern stands meet with no gaps, giving the overall impression of a tightly enclosed stadium. All the stands have two tiers, with the exception of the Stanley Bowles Stand.

The South Africa Road stand (Known as the Bhatia stand for sponsorship reasons), is the biggest of the four stands. It is a two tier stand which includes The Paddocks and contains a row of executive boxes separating The Paddocks and the upper tier. It also houses the dugouts, changing rooms, executive suites, tunnel, club offices, club shop, box office and press conference rooms. The Paddocks area is the cheapest in the ground, whereas the upper tier is the most expensive. The exclusive W12 and C Clubs are located here.

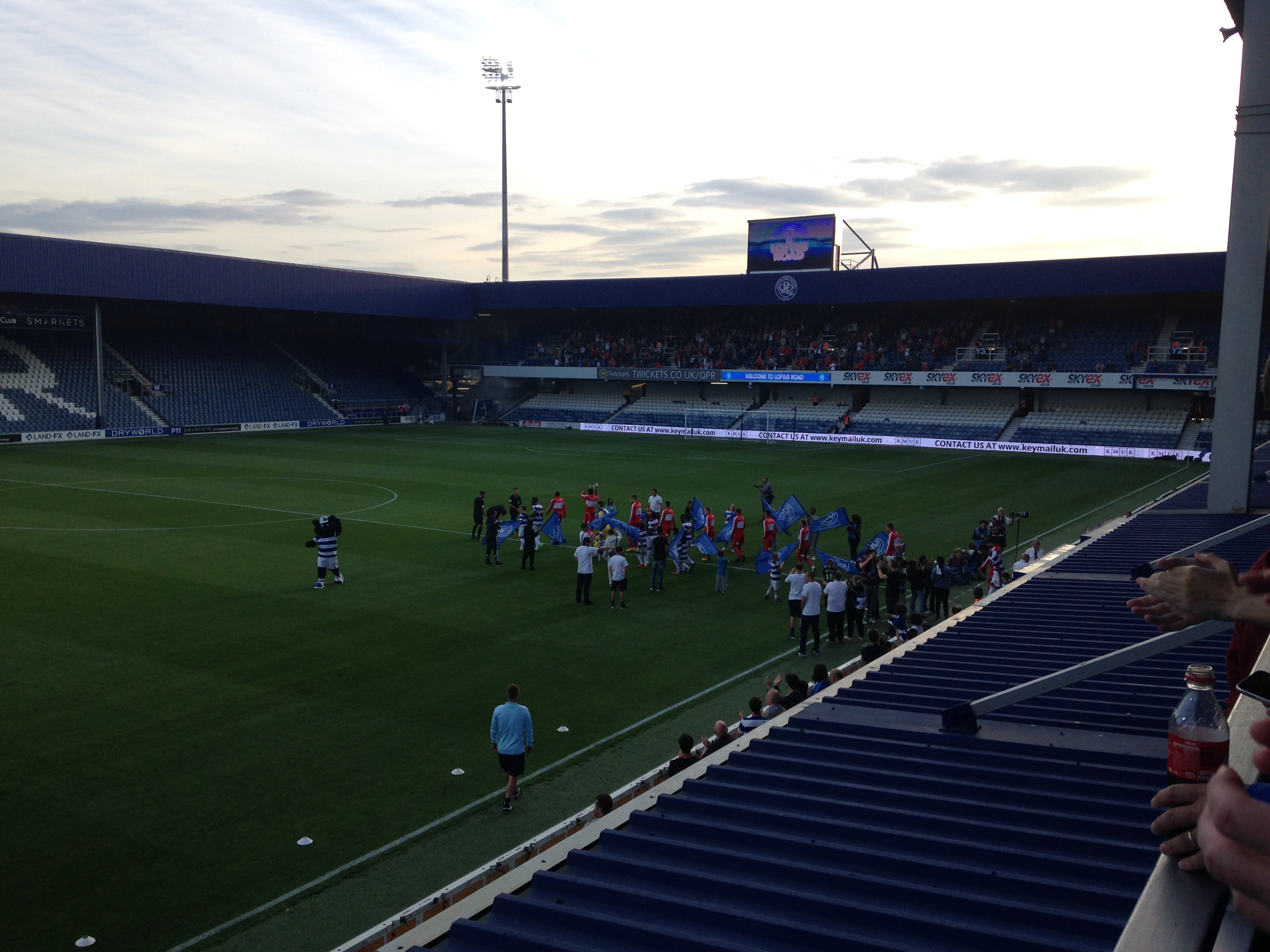
The Loftus Road Stadium before a League Cup game between QPR and Swindon Town.

The Loft End (known as the Loftus Engineering Stand for sponsorship reasons) is a two tier stand built in 1981 behind the goal and is traditionally where most members and season ticket holders sit. The lower tier became a Family Stand in the summer of 2012. This is the third most expensive stand to sit in. QPR generally opt to attack this end in the second half because it is believed to be good luck. The police crowd observation box is located in this stand and it is home to the members' bar in the ground, The Blue and White Bar. A new colour scoreboard is located at this end, installed in Summer 2008, on the advertising boards between the upper and lower tiers. As of August 2022 The Lower Loft contains 726 rail seats used for safe standing in Blocks ML, NL and PL which houses Loft Flags who create banners, flags and pre-match displays.

The Stanley Bowles Stand, formerly known as the Ellerslie Road stand, was rebuilt in 1972. It is a single tiered stand and is the smallest in height, but not in noise and capacity. It is home to the "Q Block" where, along with the Loft's P and R blocks QPR's loudest and most partisan following are located. The R Block contains 237 rail seats so the rowdiest fans can stand during the game. This stand is a favourite of some fans because of the view and atmosphere, and is the second most expensive stand in the stadium. It is also home to the commentary and television camera gantry, and is the only stand whose seat colours are not arranged in blue and white hoops, spelling out "QPR" instead and chants of "captain jack" can be heard echoing around the stadium

At the west end of the stadium is the Achilles Security Stand. The upper tier holds around 1850 seats which are allocated to away fans. The lower tier is mainly used by home fans for league games, with the exception of cup matches, with the away fans being allocated both the upper and lower tiers.

== Other uses ==
Loftus Road was home to professional rugby union team London Wasps from September 1996 to the end of the 2001–02 season, having moved from their home in Sudbury, Middlesex, as part of the deal in which Chris Wright took control of both Wasps and QPR. Wasps won the English Premiership in their first season at Loftus Road. It was part of a 7-year ground share deal negotiated by Chris Wright who had just bought Wasps as rugby union became professional. Wasps agreed to move out, to Wycombe Wanderers' Adams Park ground, at the end of the 2001–02 season to allow Fulham F.C. to rent for 2 seasons between 2002 and 2004, while their ground, Craven Cottage, was redeveloped. It was Fulham's preferred temporary ground, with the other suggested alternative being West Ham's Upton Park. It was open for Wasps to return, but Wasps decided not to move back after Fulham left. It has also been used to host the final of the British Universities and Colleges Sport football tournaments.

The venue has also been used to host boxing in the past, with the most notable bout being between Irishman Barry McGuigan and Panamanian Eusebio Pedroza on 8 June 1985 for the WBA featherweight championship in front of a sold out capacity of 27,000 spectators. The stadium was transformed into a little bit of Ireland for the evening, with the Ireland's Saturday Night on sale, and man dressed as a leprechaun dancing around the ring before the main event. McGuigan knocked the Panamanian down in the 7th round en route to a unanimous decision win: Pedroza was making the nineteenth defense of his title, and Ireland had not had a boxing world champion for 35 years. The band Yes performed at the stadium on 10 May 1975, which was recorded and featured on The Old Grey Whistle Test.

=== Internationals ===
Loftus Road hosted two England B internationals. The first was against France B in 1992 with the hosts winning, 2–0, and the other was against Russia-2 in 1998 and won, 4–1.

It was the first 'neutral' venue to capitalise on hosting international friendlies not involving England.

A testimonial match for Simon Barker saw QPR lose to the Jamaica national team by 2–1 in March 1998, with the national team returning to Loftus Road in 2002 to play Nigeria where they lost, 1–0. Israel requested to play their Euro 2004 qualifying match against Cyprus as UEFA had banned Israel from hosting home games on its own territory due to security concerns. The application was rejected as there were already five scheduled matches over the course of thirteen days as it was during the time that QPR were sharing Loftus Road with Fulham. QPR themselves played the Iranian national team in a pre-season friendly on 23 July 2005. On 14 November 2006, Australia drew 1–1 with Ghana in an international friendly at the ground. In 2007 Denmark won, 3–1, against Australia at Loftus Road. In 2008, Australia played another friendly at Loftus Road against South Africa, the match ended 2–2. South Korea won, 2–0, against Ivory Coast at Loftus Road on 3 March 2010.

Loftus Road hosted the 2015 Saudi Super Cup between Al Nassr and Al Hilal, marking the first time that the competition was held outside of Saudi Arabia.

The stadium hosted two rugby league internationals. The first was a 2004 Rugby League Tri-Nations match between Australia and New Zealand on Saturday 23 October 2004 with Australia winning, 32–16. The other was a 2005 Rugby League Tri-Nations match between Great Britain and New Zealand on 29 October 2005 with New Zealand winning, 42–26.

==== List of international football matches ====
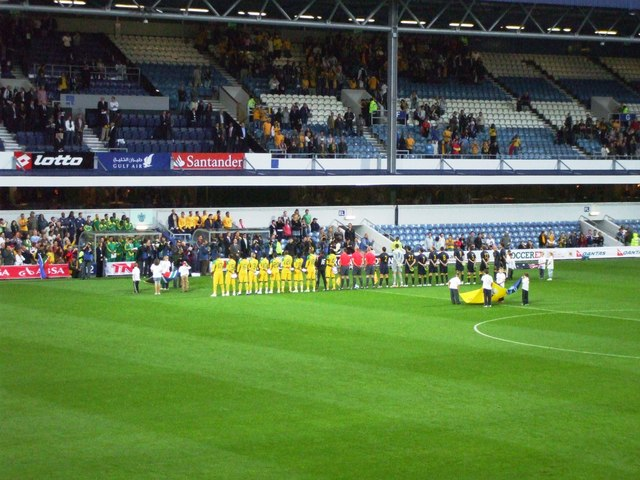
The Australia vs South Africa international at the Loftus Road Stadium in 2008.

Date	Team #1	Score	Team #2	Ref
2002	Nigeria	1–0	Jamaica	
2006	Australia	1–1	Ghana	
2006	Trinidad and Tobago	2–0	Iceland	
2007	Denmark	3–1	Australia	
2008	Australia	2–2	South Africa	
2010	South Korea	2–0	Ivory Coast	

== Transport ==
There are several London Underground stations near the stadium, the closest being White City, which is on the Central line, about five minutes walk away from the stadium. A further two minutes walk away is Wood Lane on the Hammersmith & City line. Shepherd's Bush Market is also on the Hammersmith & City line. Other nearby stations include those at Shepherd's Bush on the Central line, and Shepherd's Bush which operates trains on the London Overground and Southern networks. The Underground stations have on rare occasions been a means for Away teams to arrive, e.g. Coventry City's players arrived via the tube station in 2008 after their coach got stuck in traffic.

A number of London Buses routes run near the stadium. From South Africa Road to the north, the 228 runs in both directions, terminating at Maida Hill and Central Middlesex Hospital. On the same road, the 283 runs through to East Acton, and although it does not stop when running in the other direction on South Africa Road, it does stop on the adjacent Bloemfontein Road. Other buses nearby are the 260, 207 and SL8, each of which run down the Uxbridge Road.
