= Game 4 Grenfell =

2017 charity football match

Team Ferdinand	Team Shearer
2	2
- Team Ferdinand won 5–3 on penalties
- Date: 2 September 2017
- Venue: Loftus Road, White City, London
- Man of the Match: Mo Farah (Team Ferdinand)
- Referee: Mark Halsey
- Attendance: 17,468

Game 4 Grenfell was a charity match played on 2 September 2017 to raise money for those affected by the Grenfell Tower fire, which happened three months previous. It was played at Loftus Road, which is located only a mile from Grenfell Tower. Former professional footballers, celebrities and people associated with the Grenfell Tower fire played in the match.

It was simultaneously aired live on Sky 1 and the Freeview channel Pick. The live show was presented by comedian Adam Hills, with punditry provided from fellow comedian Alan Davies and former professional footballer Ian Wright. Match commentary was provided by Joe Speight and comedian Matt Lucas, with sideline reporting by Chris Kamara.

== Teams ==
Team Ferdinand

Professionals

- Les Ferdinand, Manager of Team Ferdinand
- Marc Bircham
- Paul Merson
- Peter Crouch
- Shay Given
- Stan Collymore
- Clint Hill
- Clive Wilson
- Damien Duff
- Danny Gabbidon
- David Seaman
- Andy Impey

Celebrities

- Ben Shephard
- Chris Edwards
- Chris "Woody" Wood
- Damian Lewis
- DJ Spoony
- Iain Glen
- James Bay
- Marcus Mumford (c)
- Mo Farah
- Olly Murs
- Serge Pizzorno
- Tinie Tempah
- Wretch 32

Individuals associated with Grenfell

- Gregg Jules, firefighter
- Adam Foster, firefighter
- Shahin Sadafi, resident
- Omar Salha, volunteer

Team Shearer

Professionals

- Alan Shearer, Manager of Team Shearer
- Andy Sinton
- Chris Sutton
- David James
- Des Walker
- Jamie Redknapp
- Jody Morris
- José Mourinho
- Kevin Gallen
- Trevor Sinclair (c)

Celebrities

- Ben Cohen
- Danny Jones
- Darren Campbell
- Dave
- Ed Westwick
- Jamie Dornan
- Jarvis Cocker
- Lee Mack
- Paul Bullion
- Ralf Little
- Richard Ashcroft
- Russell Howard
- Steve Mackey
- Tamer Hassan

Individuals associated with Grenfell

- David Badillo, firefighter
- Dean Smith, firefighter
- Oluwaseun Talabi, resident
- Bobby Ross, resident
- Paul Menacer, resident

== Match ==
=== Summary ===
Team Ferdinand quickly took the lead through Mo Farah, who dinked the ball over goalkeeper David James. It was a somewhat lucky situation, as three Team Shearer players were simultaneously bundled over by Damian Lewis as he tried to get a shot on goal. Team Shearer would equalise twelve minutes later, when Danny Jones went on a mazy run, laying the ball off to Trevor Sinclair, who put it past David Seaman. Team Ferdinand contested the decision to let the goal stand, as they thought Sinclair was offside, but referee Mark Halsey waved their appeals away. A few minutes before half-time, both sides made a double substitution consisting of the first firefighters to arrive at Grenfell Tower; this action prompted a standing ovation from the Loftus Road crowd.

Team Shearer took the lead soon after the break, with Sinclair scoring from a direct free-kick. He took advantage of substitute goalkeeper Shay Given trying to sort out his defensive wall, and his strike left Given well beaten, ricocheting off the left hand post and into the net. Team Ferdinand's namesake Les Ferdinand came on in the second half, and almost equalised for his side, but was denied by James. Ferdinand left the pitch a few minutes later.

James himself was also substituted, making way for an unusual choice: Manchester United manager José Mourinho. Mourinho quickly became the centre of attention by getting himself booked for timewasting, and for punching away a corner from Team Ferdinand. However, Team Shearer conceded the equaliser, when Stan Collymore squared the ball to Chris Edwards, who tapped it in from close range. Mourinho was furious at his defence, particularly as he felt that Team Shearer should have had a penalty at the other end just moments before.

The match was paused on the eightieth minute in remembrance of those who lost their lives in the tower fire, and both sides made a double substitution consisting of four survivors. The match would end in a draw, and went straight to penalties (in the ABBA sequence, which had recently been implemented).

=== Penalty shootout ===
Team Ferdinand went up first, with Grenfell resident Shahin Sadafi slotting it past Mourinho, despite the Portuguese getting a touch on it. Team Ferdinand also made a goalkeeper change, as neither Seaman or Given would face the penalty shootout, and Bastille drummer Chris Wood was selected for the shootout, having previously played in an outfield position earlier in the match. Firefighter David Badillo hammered his shot against the crossbar, but resident Oluwaseun Talabi soon levelled things up for Team Shearer. Firefighter Adam Foster, and volunteer Omar Salha, were both successful with their spot kicks. Mourinho then put his shot past Wood, and firefighter Dean Smith followed suit. Olly Murs scored the match-winning penalty, in what was a bit of karma for the Englishman, when he had been intentionally tackled by Mourinho in the 2014 edition of Soccer Aid.

After the match, Mourinho joked to Adam Hills that he had chosen the position of goalkeeper so that he did not have to run as much, and that he wanted to bring something fun and different to the charity match, given his status as a football manager. Grenfell resident Paul Menacer told the BBC: "We met people who want to talk and actually care about us. Someone as big as José Mourinho coming down and talking to us is just an amazing thing."

=== Match details ===
Game 4 Grenfell
2 September 2017
15:00 BST

Team Ferdinand	2–2	Team Shearer
Farah 2'; Edwards 75'	Report	Sinclair 14', 49'
Penalties
Sadafi (penalty scored); Foster (penalty scored); Salha (penalty scored); Jules (penalty scored); Murs (penalty scored)	5–3	Badillo (penalty missed); Talabi (penalty scored); Mourinho (penalty scored); Smith (penalty scored)

Loftus Road, White City
Attendance: 17,468
Referee: Mark Halsey

GK	1	David Seaman
RB	2	Danny Gabbidon
CB	6	Clint Hill
CB	4	Ben Shephard
LB	3	Clive Wilson
RM	8	Mo Farah
CM	4	Damian Lewis
LM	11	DJ Spoony
RF	7	Olly Murs
CF	25	Peter Crouch
LF	10	Marcus Mumford (c)
Substitutes:
GK	13	Shay Given
ST	12	Stan Collymore
CM	15	Tinie Tempah
CB	18	Marc Bircham
LM	19	Serge Pizzorno
CM	20	Jack Whitehall
CM	21	Paul Merson
RM	22	Chris Edwards
RM	23	Iain Glen
LM	24	Damien Duff
CM	26	Omar Salha
CM/GK	26	Chris Wood
ST	27	Shahin Sadafi
ST	29	Gregg Jules
CM	30	Adam Foster
CM	32	Wretch 32
Player-manager:
Les Ferdinand

GK	1	David James
RB	3	Ralf Little
CB	5	Des Walker
CB	6	Danny Jones
LB	2	Lee Mack
RM	7	Darren Campbell
CM	8	Jamie Redknapp
CM	9	Jamie Dornan
LM	11	Trevor Sinclair (c)
ST	20	Chris Sutton
ST	6	Ben Cohen
Substitutes:
GK	1	José Mourinho
CM	12	Jody Morris
ST	14	Dave
CB	15	Richard Ashcroft
LM	16	Andy Sinton
RB	17	Jarvis Cocker
CF	18	James Bay
LM	19	Ed Westwick
ST	21	Kevin Gallen
ST	22	Tamer Hassan
RM	23	Russell Howard
CM	24	Paul Bullion
CM	25	Steve Mackey
CM	26	Oluwaseun Talabi
CM	27	Bobby Ross
CM	28	Paul Menacer
ST	29	David Badillo
CM	30	Dean Smith
Manager:
Alan Shearer

Man of the match:

- Mo Farah (Team Ferdinand)

Match officials:

- Referee: Mark Halsey (Lancashire)

== See also ==
- 1963 England v Rest of the World football match
- UEFA Celebration Match
- Match Against Poverty
- Football for Hope
