= Albert Lockley =

Welsh footballer

Personal information
- Date of birth: 20 November 1873
- Place of birth: Cannock, Staffordshire, England
- Date of death: 26 December 1939 (aged 66)
- Place of death: Chirk, Denbighshire, Wales
- Position: Outside left

Senior career*
Years	Team	Apps	(Gls)
?–1900	Chirk		
1900–?	Druids		

International career
1898	Wales	1	(0)
- * Club domestic league appearances and goals

Albert Lockley (20 November 1873 – 26 December 1939) was a Welsh international footballer. He was part of the Wales national football team, playing one match on 19 February 1898 against Ireland.

At club level, he played for Chirk. In July 1900, it was reported that he had joined Druids.

He also played for Wrexham as a trialist.

BBC's Who Do You Think You Are revealed that actor Ralf Little is the great-grandson of Albert Lockley.

== See also ==
- List of Wales international footballers (alphabetical)
- List of Wales international footballers born outside Wales
