= Al's Lads =

2002 British film by Richard Standeven

Als Lads
- Directed by: Richard Standeven
- Written by: Marc Gee
- Produced by: Peter Barnes; Nicholas Kingston
- Starring: Marc Warren; Ralf Little; Al Sapienza
- Music by: John Harle
- Release date: June 15, 2002
- Running time: 120 minutes
- Country: United Kingdom
- Language: English

Al's Lads (released in the United States as Capone's Boys) is a 2002 British crime drama film directed by Richard Standeven and starring Marc Warren, Ralf Little and Al Sapienza.

== Plot ==
Three British Scouser merchant sailors working as waiters on a transatlantic liner in 1927 are given a chance to work for the Al Capone gang, after running booze (bootlegging) into the US during Prohibition.

I was told a story by a gentleman called Leo White and after doing some research, found to be true (though I never doubted it- Scousers get everywhere don't they!) Subsequently Vic Gibson wrote an article in the Liverpool Echo- the response was both dramatic and energising. I received letters and phone calls from people scattered throughout the Merseyside area, confirming that their Great Uncles or Grandfathers were Al Capone's bodyguards or bootleggers. This confirmation of authenticity led me to pen the story and with the addition of a little artistic licence, to develop the musical play-"Al's Lads"

— Marc Gee

== Cast ==
- Marc Warren as Jimmy
- Kirsty Mitchell as Edith
- Peter Pedrero as Brendan
- Al Sapienza as Georgio
- Ralf Little as Dan
- Julian Littman as Al Capone
- Scott Maslen as Sammy
- Stephen Lord as Eddy
- Richard Roundtree as Boom Boom
- Warwick Davis as Leo
- Ricky Tomlinson as Billy
