= The Café (British TV series) =

Sitcom on Sky1, 2011–13

- Genre: Sitcom
- Written by: Ralf Little; Michelle Terry
- Directed by: Craig Cash (series 1); Robin Sheppard (series 2)
- Starring: Ellie Haddington; Michelle Terry; June Watson; Ralf Little; Daniel Ings; Phoebe Waller-Bridge; Kevin Trainor; David Troughton; Seeta Indrani; Brian Murphy; Marcia Warren; Carolin Stoltz; Jack Roth
- Composer: Adam Lipinski
- Country of origin: United Kingdom
- Original language: English
- No. of series: 2
- No. of episodes: 13 (list of episodes)

Production
- Camera setup: Single-camera
- Running time: 30 mins 60 mins (final episode)
- Production company: Jellylegs Productions

Original release
- Network: Sky1
- Release: 23 November 2011 – 4 September 2013

The Café is a British sitcom written by and starring Ralf Little and Michelle Terry broadcast by Sky1.

The series premiered on 23 November 2011.

== Premise ==
The series is set in and around a café in Weston-super-Mare run by generational trio Mary (June Watson), Carol (Ellie Haddington) and Sarah (Michelle Terry).

== Cast ==
- Ellie Haddington as Carol Porter
- Michelle Terry as Sarah Porter
- June Watson as Mary Ellis
- Ralf Little as Richard Dickens
- Phoebe Waller-Bridge as Chloe Astill
- Kevin Trainor as Keiran Barker
- David Troughton as Stan Astill
- Seeta Indrani as Brenda Kiely
- Brian Murphy as Jack Dobson
- Marcia Warren as Alice Dobson
- Carolin Stoltz as Ava Lipinski
- Daniel Ings as John Streatfield (series 1)
- Jack Roth as Big Issue Frank (series 1)
- Robert Glenister as Phil Porter (series 2)
- Kobna Holdbrook-Smith as Jason (series 2)
- Charlie Dimmock as self

== Production ==
The series is co-written by two of its lead actors, Ralf Little and Michelle Terry. The first series was directed by Craig Cash, writer and cast member of The Royle Family (which also starred Little). The series was filmed in Weston-super-Mare. The first series was filmed in early 2011 whilst the second series was filmed throughout June, July and August 2012. The cafe set was built for the show. Cash and Little both worked together on The Royle Family. Little and Terry met around 2008 whilst performing a sketch together at the Bush Theatre for the Latitude Festival.

The title song for the series is the pop standard "Beyond the Sea", which was sung by Kathryn Williams.

== Building and legacy ==
The 11 m (36 ft) octagonal cafe building - which included a veranda and dovecote turret - was specially constructed, sited on Weston's sea front and after cancellation was put into storage. There was later an application for it be re-constructed and re-located to Hamilton Park in Taunton, Somerset. However, despite planning consent being achieved, the process proved too difficult and time consuming, and instead it was auctioned off for charity eBay, with the money raised going to the Army Benevolent Fund and The Baton charities.

== Episodes ==
=== Series 1 (2011) ===
| No. overall | No. in series | Title | Directed by | Written by | Original release date | Viewers |
|---|---|---|---|---|---|---|
| 1 | 1 | "There's No Place Like Home" | Craig Cash | Ralf Little & Michelle Terry | 23 November 2011 | 1,059,000 |
Quiet life in the sleepy seaside town of Weston-super-Mare, and its even sleepier seafront café, Cyril's, is thrown into a state of mild disarray when a flashy events manager from London comes to visit his ill mother.
| 2 | 2 | "Afternoon Tease" | Craig Cash | Ralf Little & Michelle Terry | 23 November 2011 | 722,000 |
Sarah chases some literary agents, and the Dobsons spark a heated debate about jam and cream. Meanwhile, something strange is going on with Carol and the cafe.
| 3 | 3 | "Out with the Old" | Craig Cash | Ralf Little & Michelle Terry | 30 November 2011 | 581,000 |
Carol introduces a new menu at Cyril's in an attempt to attract a wider clientele, a decision which does not go down well with the regulars. Meanwhile, Richard is jealous when Sarah attends the pub quiz with John, Mary reveals her dislike for `grockles', and Kieran's array of outlandish costumes continues to impress.
| 4 | 4 | "A Note to Follow" | Craig Cash | Ralf Little & Michelle Terry | 7 December 2011 | 535,000 |
The night of the Sound of Music sing-along event arrives, and Chloe is desperate to get all the gossip on what happened between Sarah and John at the quiz — and she is not disappointed. Stan urges Carol to forget her financial concerns and join in with the evening's fun, and the unveiling of the costumes goes very differently for Mary and Chloe.
| 5 | 5 | "Fragile, Handle with Care" | Craig Cash | Ralf Little & Michelle Terry | 14 December 2011 | 662,000 |
Sarah reveals the outcome of her meeting with a literary agent in Bristol, but gets no answer when she calls Richard to tell him the news. Meanwhile, Brenda makes a formal offer for the lease of Cyril's, but Carol is more concerned about the whereabouts of Stan.
| 6 | 6 | "Deal or No Deal" | Craig Cash | Ralf Little & Michelle Terry | 21 December 2011 | Under 518,000 |
The Cyril's regulars hold a surprise birthday party for Carol, but the cafe owner's mind is elsewhere as she considers Brenda's offer for the lease. Her friends and family keep their fingers crossed as they await the big announcement.

=== Series 2 (2013) ===
| No. overall | No. in series | Title | Directed by | Written by | Original release date | Viewers |
|---|---|---|---|---|---|---|
| 7 | 1 | "Diminishing Returns" | Robin Sheppard | Ralf Little & Michelle Terry | 24 July 2013 | 406,000 |
Stan is planning a big surprise for Carol, only for it to be scuppered by the arrival of a photographer hired to shoot a tourist brochure – a man who also just happens to be Carol's ex-husband and Sarah's dad. Meanwhile, an unexpected announcement from Richard and Ava causes a stir, and Mary gets more than she expected when she starts tweeting.
| 8 | 2 | "Connection Failure" | Robin Sheppard | Ralf Little & Michelle Terry | 31 July 2013 | 342,000 |
Phil tries to repair his relationship with Sarah, but his daughter is still reeling from the news of Richard and Ava's engagement and in no mood for life advice. Meanwhile, Stan experiences further delays in asking Carol the big question, Kieran clashes with a trio of clowns as the circus arrives in town, and new boy Jason reveals the reasons behind his stint at the allotments.
| 9 | 3 | "There Were Three In A Bed" | Robin Sheppard | Ralf Little & Michelle Terry | 7 August 2013 | 365,000 |
Sarah looks forward to catching up with Richard over a game of darts – but doesn't count on bride-to-be Ava inviting herself along – while best pal Chloe is forced to reconsider her dirty weekend with the estate agent after she bumps into his wife. At least Mary is having a good time – or at least she will be when she gets her hands on Jack's shiny new boules.
| 10 | 4 | "Time and Tide" | Robin Sheppard | Ralf Little & Michelle Terry | 14 August 2013 | Under 363,000 |
It's a big day for Cyril's as Phil prepares to take the official photo of the cafe for the tourist brochure. However, the timing couldn't be any worse, what with Carol suffering hot flushes and Stan in an argumentative mood. Sarah is much happier, however, and is enjoying spending her time with Jason, while Chloe makes a discovery and takes her driving test – for the eighth time.
| 11 | 5 | "Mum's the Word" | Robin Sheppard | Ralf Little & Michelle Terry | 21 August 2013 | Under 336,000 |
Sarah realises she still has feelings for Richard and believes he is making a huge mistake in marrying Ava. But that doesn't stop her suggesting they hold their wedding reception at the cafe – surely a recipe for disaster? Stan considers pulling the plug on his proposal after some surprising news, Chloe can't decide whether to keep the baby and Mare proves you're never too old to get down with the kids.
| 12 | 6 | "Stags or Hens" | Robin Sheppard | Ralf Little & Michelle Terry | 28 August 2013 | 405,000 |
Richard and Ava celebrate their last night of singledom on the evening before their wedding. The hen do kicks off with wild drinking games and strippers, while the stag do is rather more low-key, with Richard opting for a few beers on the beach. As the parties progress, an emotional and intoxicated Sarah manages to completely misread a situation with Jason, before setting out to have a heart-to-heart with the bride-to-be.
| 13 | 7 | "Reap What You Sow" | Robin Sheppard | Ralf Little & Michelle Terry | 4 September 2013 | Under 397,000 |
(double-length episode) Ava leaves Richard stranded at the altar on their wedding day – and Sarah, spurred on by her father, senses an opportunity to reveal her feelings for him. Meanwhile, Carol is delighted when Stan finally pops the question, and Mare makes a decision about moving into retirement community The Lodge.

== Reception ==
Mark Webster of Sabotage Times had this to say about the doubled-billed premier: "Over the last couple of years or so, Sky One have clearly made a consolidated effort to present themselves as a channel that wants to do its business just like their buddies over on terrestrial, and in giving this gently lapping little comedy space alongside the likes of 'Ross Kemp On..', 'A League Of Their Own' and David Walliams 'Wall Of Fame', they are proving they've got the chops to do it".

Tom Meltzer of The Guardian gave the series a mixed review. "In fairness to the writers, their performances are both consistently excellent, and the direction is both naturalistic and nicely understated. But while, as the name suggests, the show owes a clear debt to The Office in its style, it sadly failed to nick Gervais and Merchant's knack for writing characters, stories and, crucially, jokes".

== Cancelled DVD release ==
The complete first series of The Café was set to be released in 2013 to coincide with series two's television airing. However, in August 2014 it was decided that the release would be cancelled indefinitely due to poor ratings. It is unknown if or when the series will be released.
