= Michelle Terry =

English actress, writer (born 1979)

- Born: 1979 (age 46–47); Nuneaton, Warwickshire, UK
- Education: Cardiff University (BA); Royal Academy of Dramatic Art (BA)
- Spouse: Paul Ready (m. 2017)
- Children: 1

Michelle Terry (born 1979) is an English actress and writer, known for her extensive work for Shakespeare's Globe, the Royal Shakespeare Company and the Royal National Theatre, as well as her television work, notably writing and starring in the Sky One television series The Café. Terry took up the role of artistic director at Shakespeare's Globe in April 2018. In October 2026 it was announced that she would step down in Summer 2027, after reprising her role in Mother Courage and her Children.

In 2010, Terry won the Laurence Olivier Award for Best Actress in a Supporting Role for her portrayal of Sylvia in Tribes at the Royal Court Theatre.

== Early life ==
Terry was born in Nuneaton, moving while still a child to grow up in Weston-super-Mare. She was raised in Kewstoke, and attended Priory Community School and Broadoak Sixth Form Centre.

Terry aspired to be an actress from an early age. She attended an amateur dramatic society and took LAMDA exams at school in poetry, prose and spoken verse. At the age of fourteen she joined the National Youth Theatre. She read English literature at Cardiff University before training at the Royal Academy of Dramatic Art, graduating in 2004.

== Career ==
=== Theatre ===
Terry made her professional debut in the touring and subsequent West End production of Blithe Spirit, playing the Maid and understudying Elvira. Her other theatre credits include The War on Terror, 50 Ways to Leave Your Lover, The Man Who Had All the Luck, Tribes and As You Like It. Her work at the National Theatre includes London Assurance, All's Well That Ends Well and England People Very Nice. She also appeared in broadcast versions of London Assurance and All's Well That Ends Well as part of National Theatre Live. For the Royal Shakespeare Company, Terry has appeared in productions of Days of Significance, Pericles, The Winter's Tale, The Crucible and Love's Labour's Lost, playing Rosaline. She was among the writers of Sudden Loss of Dignity, staged at the Bush Theatre in 2009.

Terry won critical acclaim for her work at Shakespeare's Globe Theatre, for her performance of Rosalind in As You Like It. London's Financial Times wrote "I'm not sure it's possible to see Michelle Terry on a stage without falling a little in love with her. She has the intelligence, inventiveness and vivacity to play the character and the show simultaneously, not setting herself above the material but relishing her immersion in the role and inviting us to share it with her." She also appeared in productions of Love's Labour's Lost and A Midsummer Night's Dream at that venue, both of which were released on DVD. On 24 July 2017 she was announced as its fourth artistic director, to succeed Emma Rice in April 2018.

==== Hamlet, 2018 ====
Terry starred in the lead role in a 2018 gender fluid version of Hamlet. The Spectator said in their review "No one but Ms Terry would have hired Ms Terry for this role. She's a decent second-tier actress without any special vocal or physical endowments."

The Guardian called the play "a perfectly decent production and a welcome relief from the work of the previous Globe regime, which seemed to assume that the plays were a bit boring unless jazzed up."

The Stage said: "It's a production that places clarity of verse and emotion over directorial fireworks. One of the most striking elements is Terry's costume. When she assumes her antic disposition, she also dons a white clown suit with a jagged lipstick grin. By making Hamlet a jester, it licenses her to behave in different ways. It shifts her status in the family. It grants her power and marks her apart. Laughter can be a weapon after all. It's an interesting idea that is under-explored."

==== Macbeth, 2018 ====
Terry starred in the lead role of Lady Macbeth opposite her husband Paul Ready in Macbeth at the Globe's candlelit Sam Wanamaker Playhouse.

==== Twelfth Night, 2021 ====
In The Globe's 2021 production of Twelfth Night, directed by Sean Holmes, Terry starred as Viola.

==== Richard III, 2024 ====
In The Globe's 2024 production of Richard III, Terry was cast in the lead, which generated backlash and controversy over a non-disabled actor being cast as a disabled character and historical figure, a practice commonly referred to as cripping-up. The script was also edited in an attempt to make Richard non-disabled which subsequently led to 281 disabled actors and allied art professionals, and 35 organisations including several theatre companies, under the name of this Disabled Artists Alliance speaking out against this casting and "the erasure and rewriting of Richard's core disabled identity".

=== Television ===
Her television credits include episodes of Extras, Law & Order: UK and the Mike Bullen pilot Reunited, playing "Sara". She was co-writer, with Ralf Little, of the comedy drama TV series, The Café, which aired on Sky1 from 2011 to 2013, in which she played "Sarah Porter". The series was set and filmed in her own hometown, Weston-super-Mare.

=== Writing ===
Besides co-writing The Café, Terry has co-written two plays. The first was Sudden Loss of Dignity for the Bush Theatre in 2009, which she co-wrote with Zawe Ashton, James Graham, Joel Horwood, and Morgan Lloyd Malcolm. In 2015, it was announced she would write for My Mark, a ten-year project from the Donmar Warehouse charting the political growth of the next voting generation. In 2017, she co-wrote and starred in Becoming with Rosalie Craig.

== Theatre ==
Year(s)	Title	Role	Theatre	Ref.
2004/5	Blithe Spirit	Edith	Savoy Theatre	
2005	As You Like It	Celia	New Vic Theatre	
2005	The Burial at Thebes	Ismene/Chorus	Nottingham Playhouse	
2006	Beautiful Thing	Leah	Sound Theatre	
2006	The Crucible	Mary Warren	Royal Shakespeare Theatre	
2006/7	Pericles	Philemon	Swan Theatre	
2006/7	The Winter's Tale	Perdita	Swan Theatre	
2007	Days of Significance	Clare	Swan Theatre	
2007	The Promise	Lika	New Wimbledon Theatre	
2007	Love's Labour's Lost	Princess of France	Shakespeare's Globe	
2008	The War on Terror	Woman	Bush Theatre	
2008	Two Cigarettes	Girl	Bush Theatre	
2008	50 Ways to Leave Your Lover	Various	Bush Theatre	
2008	The Man Who Had All the Luck	Hester Falk	Donmar Warehouse	
2008	50 Ways to Leave Your Lover at Christmas	Various	Bush Theatre	
2009	Sudden Loss of Dignity	Co-writer	Bush Theatre	
2009	England People Very Nice	Camille/Mary/Black Ruth/Deborah	National Theatre	
2009	All's Well That Ends Well	Helena	National Theatre	
2009	Love's Labour's Lost	Princess of France	Shakespeare's Globe	
2010	London Assurance	Grace Harkaway	National Theatre	
2010	Light Shining in Buckinghamshire	Henry Ireton	Arcola Theatre	
2010	Tribes	Sylvia	Royal Court Theatre	
2011/12	The Comedy of Errors	Luciana	National Theatre	
2012/13	In the Republic of Happiness	Madeleine	Royal Court Theatre	
2013	Before the Party	Kathleen Skinner	Almeida Theatre	
2013	A Midsummer Night's Dream	Hippolyta/Titania	Shakespeare's Globe	
2014	Love's Labour's Lost	Rosaline	Royal Shakespeare Theatre	
2014	Much Ado About Nothing (Love's Labour's Won)	Beatrice	Royal Shakespeare Theatre	
2014	Privacy	Director	Donmar Warehouse	
2015	My Mark	Writer	Donmar Warehouse	
2015	As You Like It	Rosalind	Shakespeare's Globe	
2016	Cleansed	Grace	National Theatre	
2016	Henry V	King Henry V	Regent's Park Open Air Theatre	
2016	Prom 48	Titania/Hippolyta	Royal Albert Hall	
2017	Becoming	Self/Co-writer	Donmar Warehouse	
2018	As You Like It	Adam/William/Jacques de Buoys	Shakespeare's Globe	
2018	Hamlet	Hamlet	Shakespeare's Globe	
2018/19	Macbeth	Lady Macbeth	Sam Wanamaker Playhouse	
2019	Henry IV, Part 1	Hotspur	Shakespeare's Globe	
2020	The Taming of the Shrew	Biondello	Sam Wanamaker Playhouse	
2020	Macbeth: A Conjuring	Lady Macbeth	Sam Wanamaker Playhouse	
2020	Deep Night, Dark Night	Writer	Sam Wanamaker Playhouse	
2021	Twelfth Night	Viola	Shakespeare's Globe	
2022	King Lear	Cordelia/Fool	Shakespeare's Globe	
2022	The Fir Tree	Director	Shakespeare's Globe	
2023	A Midsummer Night's Dream	Puck	Shakespeare's Globe	
2023	Twelfth Night: For One Night Only	Olivia	Shakespeare's Globe	
2024	Richard III	King Richard III	Shakespeare's Globe	
2025	Three Sisters	Olga	Sam Wanamaker Playhouse	
2025	An Oak Tree	Guest performer	Young Vic	
2025	A Midsummer Night's Dream: For One Night Only	Hippolyta/Titania	Shakespeare's Globe	
2026	Mother Courage and her Children	Mother Courage	Shakespeare's Globe	
2027	Mother Courage and her Children	Mother Courage	Shakespeare's Globe	

== Filmography ==
=== Film ===
Year	Title	Role	Notes	Ref.
2010	Reunited	Sara		
2011	Five Truths	Ophelia	Video installation for V&A	
2011	My Times		Short film	
2013	Fifty Years on Stage	Dr. Bird/Shepherd 3		
2016	The Complete Walk: As You Like It		Director, short film	
2016	The Complete Walk: King John		Director, short film	
2016	The Complete Walk: Richard III		Director, short film	
2016	The Complete Walk: The Winter's Tale		Director, short film	
2016	The Complete Walk: Hamlet	Hamlet	Short film	

=== Television ===
Year	Title	Role	Notes	Ref.
2005	Extras	Female Extra	Episode: "Patrick Stewart"	
2009	Law & Order: UK	Debbie Grove	Episode: "Unloved"	
2011	The Café	Sarah Porter	Actress/writer/producer	
2018	Marcella	Jane Colletti	7 episodes	
2025	Rob & Romesh VS	Guest	Episode: "Shakespeare"	

=== Radio ===
Year	Title	Role	Station	Notes	Ref.
2013	Listening to the Dead	Clara	BBC Radio 4	Episode: "Four Sons"	
2013	Pilgrim	Norah	BBC Radio 4	Episode: "Woolmere Walter"	
2014	Educator	Maria	BBC Radio 3		
2014	Pride and Prejudice	Charlotte Lucas	BBC Radio 4	2 episodes	
2014	Words and Music	Reader	BBC Radio 3	Episode: "Women Beware Women"	
2015	Book of the Week	Reader	BBC Radio 4	5 episodes: "All Day Long"	
2023	The Essay	Reader	BBC Radio 3	Episode: "Reading the First Folio – Michelle Terry on As You Like It"	

== Awards ==
Terry won Best Actress in a Visiting Production at the 2008 Manchester Evening News Theatre Awards, for the Donmar Warehouse production of The Man Who Had All the Luck.

She won Best Actress in a Supporting Role at the 2011 Laurence Olivier Awards, for her portrayal of Sylvia in the Royal Court Theatre production of Tribes.
