= Kevin Trainor =

Irish actor

Kevin Trainor is an Irish actor of stage and screen.

== Early life ==
From Kilkeel, County Down, Northern Ireland, Trainor attended St Colman's College in Newry, where he was a close contemporary of fellow actor Michael Legge, before attending Emmanuel College, Cambridge, where he read English. After Cambridge, Trainor trained at the Royal Academy of Dramatic Art from 2001 to 2004.

== Career ==
Making an early cameo appearance in the 2001 film The Hole while at RADA, he also appeared in the 2005 Royal Shakespeare Company season.

He is notable for portraying the younger version of Trevor Bruttenholm (played as an older man by John Hurt) in the film Hellboy; as the character John in The Catherine Tate Show (from the "Ulster Mum" series of sketches); as Charles Adams in the HBO miniseries John Adams; and as "living statue" Keiran Barker in Sky 1 television comedy-drama The Café.

Trainor earned critical accolades for his appearance in the special flash-back episode that launched the 2014 second series of Channel 4's Utopia. His performance as Mr Omida, an immaculate and punctilious torturer, was described by Metro as "the most chilling torturer committed to screen in a long time" and by Geeks Unleashed as "the very neat, precise and sinister Mr Omida, who wins the creepiest man alive award". Kevin also appeared in the documentary drama 'Titanic: Birth of a Legend' as Alfred Cunningham, apprentice fitter.

== Selected Theatre Work ==
In 2008, Trainor appeared as Moth to Peter Bowles's Don Armado in Sir Peter Hall's Love's Labour's Lost at the Rose Theatre, Kingston.

Trainor played Jonesy, a savant with pervasive developmental disorder in the first production of Lost Monsters by Laurence Wilson at the Everyman Theatre, Liverpool in 2009.

In 2010, he played Trent Conway in Six Degrees of Separation at the Old Vic, London. In the same year Trainor took a leading role in Jonathan Harvey's new play, Canary, in the Hampstead Theatre and on tour. His character was unrepentant gay man avant la lettre and campaigner, Billy, whose life as portrayed spans the modern period of gay liberation in Great Britain. Billy's initial betrayal at the hands of his closeted lover and, later, that of society in the form of committal for aversion therapy, leads ultimately to the character's imprisonment when he kills his treating doctor in an encounter in a gay bar. Harvey offers this as a reminder to his audience of the numerous hopeless casualties of the struggle for gay rights. Trainor himself has spoken of his pride in being centrally involved in such a "campaigning piece".

In 2011, Trainor starred as Bertie Wooster in the revival of By Jeeves, a musical by Andrew Lloyd Webber and Alan Ayckbourn, at the Landor Theatre in Clapham, London. He was off-stage for just thirty seconds during the performance. Later in the year, he returned to the Old Vic to play a "strapping" Shawn Keogh in Playboy of the Western World directed by John Crowley.

Trainor returned to his native Northern Ireland in 2012 to appear in the ensemble play Titanic (Scenes from the British Wreck Commissioner's Inquiry 1912) by Owen McCafferty at the new MAC Theatre in Belfast.

In 2013, Trainor starred as Faustus opposite Siobhan Redmond's Mephistopheles in Marlowe's Doctor Faustus in an avant-garde co-production between Glasgow's Citizens Theatre and the Leeds West Yorkshire Playhouse. New scenes were written to complement Marlowe's incomplete text by Irish playwright Colin Teevan.

== Filmography ==
Year	Title	Role	Notes
2001	The Hole	Boy in School	
2004	Hellboy	Young Broom	
2005	The Commander: Blackdog	Alan McKellen	TV movie
2005	Titanic: Birth of a Legend	Alfie Cunningham	TV movie
2006	The Catherine Tate Show	John	Episode: Mum, I'm Gay
2006	Tripping Over	Young Actor	1 episode
2008	John Adams	Charles Adams	Miniseries
2011-2013	The Café	Keiran Barker	
2012	Sherlock	Billy	Episode: The Hounds of Baskerville
2013	Vera	Kit O'Dowd	Episode: Young Gods
2013	London Irish	Mark	1 episode
2014	Utopia	Mr. Omida	1 episode
2016	Endeavour	Jerome Hogg	Episode: Coda
2023	Clean Sweep	Martin Kelly	4 episodes
