= Ireland's Saturday Night =

Northern Irish sports newspaper

- Type: Weekly newspaper (Saturday)
- Owner(s): Belfast Telegraph
- Formerly: Ulster Saturday Night
- Founded: 1894
- Language: English
- Ceased publication: 26 July 2008

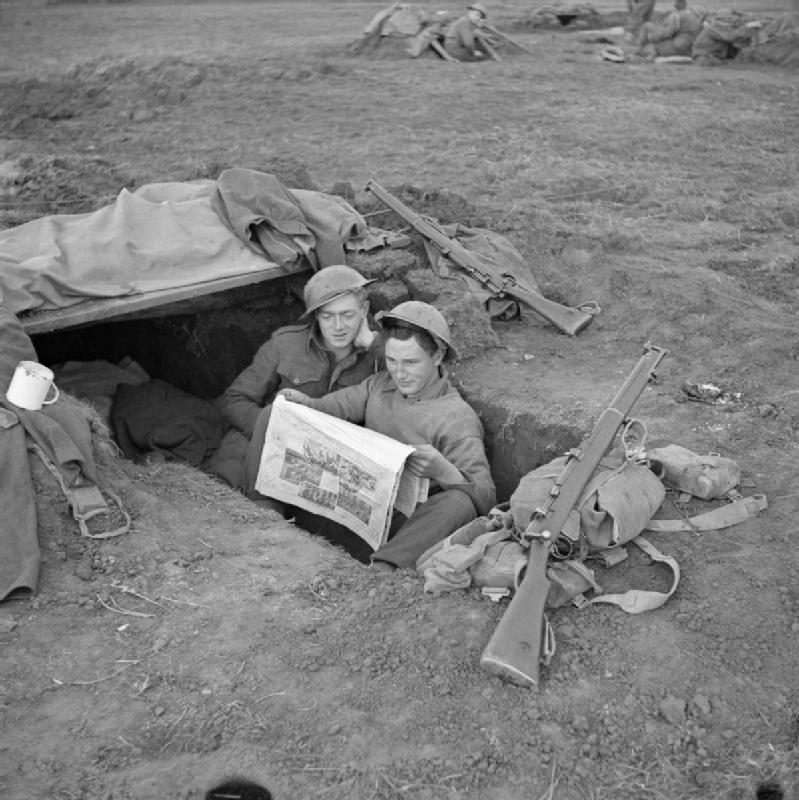
Men of the 2nd Royal Inniskilling Fusiliers reading Ireland's Saturday Night in their foxhole in the Anzio bridgehead, 17 March 1944

Ireland's Saturday Night was a Northern Ireland sports newspaper, which was part of the Belfast Telegraph group. It was launched in 1894 under its original title, Ulster Saturday Night, changing to Ireland's Saturday Night in 1896 and running two separate editions; one for north and one for the south of Ireland. It continued to carry the nickname The Ulster.

The paper was also known as The Pink, as it was originally printed on pink paper until 1917. This was to distinguish the paper from the main daily at the time, The Belfast Evening Telegraph. It focused on Irish Football League coverage and was delivered late on Saturday evenings so that the day's afternoon matches could be reviewed.

Circulation declined in the 2000s as more and more people were getting their sports news on the Internet. In July 2008 it was announced that the paper was to stop production. The final edition was printed on 26 July 2008 and included a special pull out on the history of the paper.
