= List of Queens Park Rangers F.C. managers =

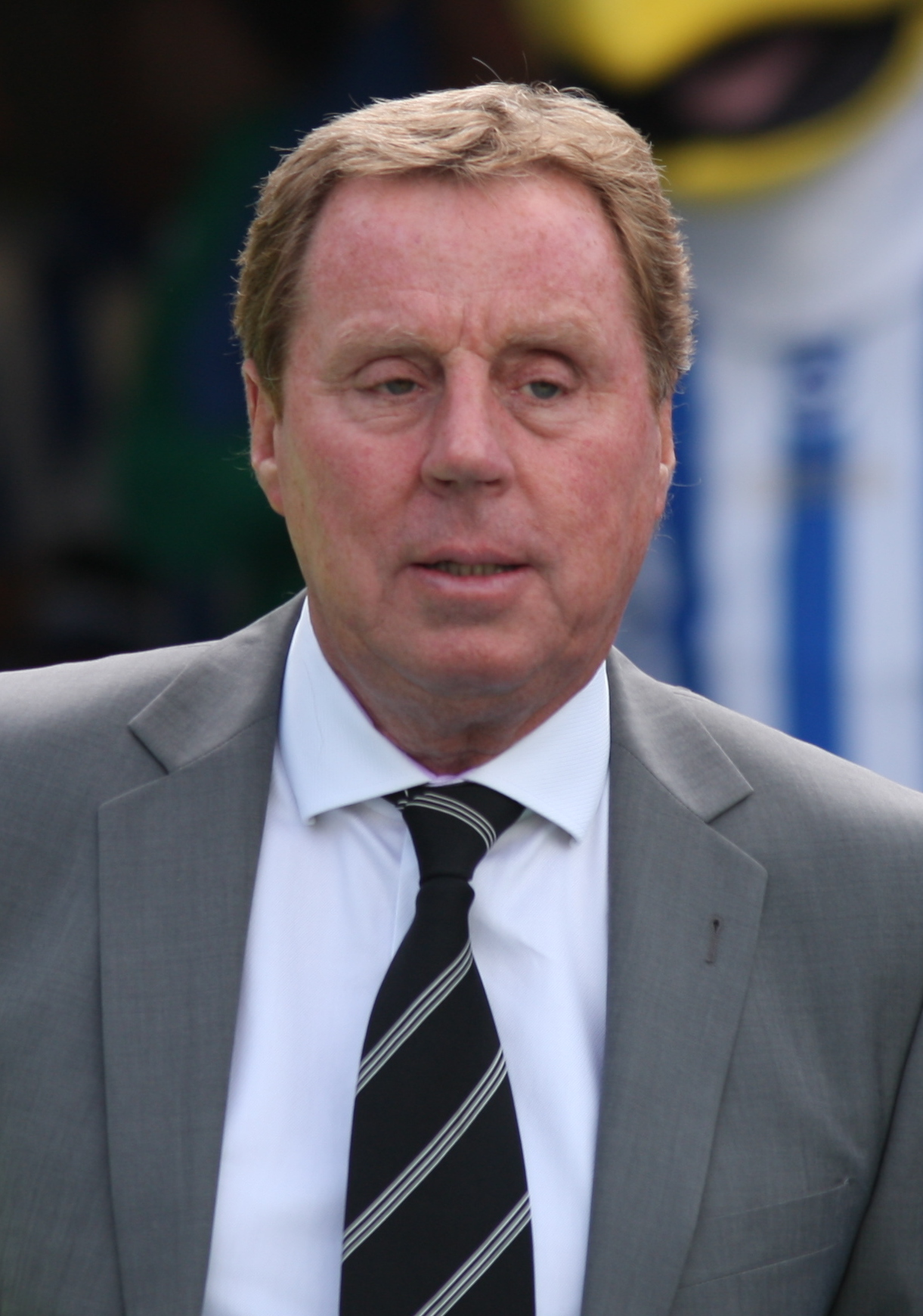
Harry Redknapp was appointed the Queens Park Rangers manager in November 2012.

The following article is a list of all Queens Park Rangers Football Club managers. This chronological list comprises all those who have held the position of manager of the first team of QPR since they turned professional in 1898. Each manager's entry includes his dates of tenure and the club's overall competitive record (in terms of matches won, drawn and lost), honours won and significant achievements while under his care. Caretaker managers are included, where known, as well as those who have been in permanent charge. As of the start of Mark Warburton's appointment during the beginning of the 2019–20 season, QPR have had 56 full-time managers, with the unusually high figure of 21 management changes in the last 10 years.

== Managers ==
Information correct as of 3 May 2026. Competitive matches counted only. Permanent managers are only on this list.

| Name | Nat | From | To | Time in Charge | G | W | D | L | Win %^{[A]} | Honours and/or notes | Ref(s) |
|---|---|---|---|---|---|---|---|---|---|---|---|
| James Cowan | Scotland | 1 August 1906 | 31 March 1913 | 6 years, 242 days | 296 | 128 | 85 | 83 | 43.2 | Southern Football League champions 1907/08, FA Charity Shield runners–up 1908, 1912 | |
| James Howie | Scotland | 1 August 1913 | 1 April 1920 | 6 years, 244 days | 236 | 85 | 48 | 103 | 36.0 | – | |
| Ned Liddle | England | 1 April 1920 | 31 March 1924 | 3 years, 365 days | 177 | 71 | 42 | 64 | 40.1 | – | |
| Bob Hewison | England | 1 August 1925 | 1 May 1930 | 4 years, 273 days | 219 | 80 | 53 | 86 | 36.5 | – | |
| Archie Mitchell | England | 1 November 1931 | 1 May 1933 | 1 year, 181 days | 79 | 32 | 18 | 29 | 40.5 | – | |
| Mick O'Brien | (Republic of Ireland) Ireland | 1 May 1933 | 1 April 1935 | 1 year, 335 days | 84 | 40 | 16 | 28 | 47.6 | – | |
| Billy Birrell | Scotland | 1 April 1935 | 1 May 1939 | 4 years, 30 days | 184 | 85 | 42 | 57 | 46.2 | – | |
| Ted Vizard | Wales | 1 May 1939 | 1 April 1944 | 4 years, 336 days | 186 | 95 | 29 | 62 | 51.1 | – | |
| Dave Mangnall | England | 1 April 1944 | 31 May 1952 | 8 years, 60 days | 280 | 112 | 74 | 94 | 40.0 | Football League Third Division South champions 1947/48 | |
| Jack Taylor | England | 1 June 1952 | 1 May 1959 | 7 years, 0 days | 341 | 118 | 89 | 134 | 34.6 | – | |
| Alec Stock | England | 1 August 1959 | 1 August 1968 | 9 years, 0 days | 439 | 206 | 104 | 129 | 46.9 | Football League Third Division champions 1966/67; Football League Cup winners 1966/67 | |
| Bill Dodgin, Jr. | England | 1 August 1968 | 1 November 1968 | 92 days | 16 | 2 | 5 | 9 | 12.5 | – | |
| Tommy Docherty | Scotland | 1 November 1968 | 30 November 1968 | 29 days | 4 | 1 | 0 | 3 | 25.0 | – | |
| Les Allen | England | 1 December 1968 | 6 January 1971 | 2 years, 36 days | 99 | 31 | 23 | 45 | 31.3 | – | |
| Gordon Jago | England | 6 January 1971 | 27 September 1974 | 3 years, 264 days | 161 | 71 | 55 | 35 | 44.1 | Football League Division Two runners-up 1972/73 | |
| Dave Sexton | England | 16 October 1974 | 9 July 1977 | 2 years, 266 days | 130 | 57 | 32 | 41 | 43.8 | Football League Division One runners-up 1975/76 | |
| Frank Sibley | England | 10 July 1977 | 29 July 1978 | 1 year, 19 days | 45 | 9 | 17 | 19 | 20.0 | – | |
| Alec Stock | England | 30 July 1978 | 1 August 1978 | 2 days | 0 | 0 | 0 | 0 | — | – | |
| Steve Burtenshaw | England | 10 August 1978 | 10 May 1979 | 273 days | 41 | 6 | 13 | 22 | 14.6 | – | |
| Tommy Docherty | Scotland | 11 May 1979 | 1 October 1980 | 1 year, 143 days | 51 | 20 | 16 | 15 | 39.2 | – | |
| Terry Venables | England | 1 October 1980 | 24 May 1984 | 3 years, 236 days | 179 | 89 | 36 | 54 | 49.7 | FA Cup runners-up 1981/82; Football League Division Two champions 1982/83 | |
| Gordon Jago | England | 28 May 1984 | 5 June 1984 | 8 days | 0 | 0 | 0 | 0 | — | – | |
| Alan Mullery | England | 20 June 1984 | 5 December 1984 | 168 days | 26 | 11 | 8 | 7 | 42.3 | – | |
| Frank Sibley | England | 5 December 1984 | 1 June 1985 | 178 days | 28 | 8 | 6 | 14 | 28.6 | – | |
| Jim Smith | England | 11 June 1985 | 4 December 1988 | 3 years, 176 days | 167 | 67 | 38 | 62 | 40.1 | Football League Cup runners-up 1985/86 | |
| Trevor Francis | England | 14 December 1988 | 27 November 1989 | 348 days | 93 | 31 | 30 | 32 | 33.3 | – | |
| Don Howe | England | 28 November 1989 | 21 May 1991 | 1 year, 174 days | 75 | 27 | 21 | 27 | 36.0 | – | |
| Gerry Francis | England | 1 June 1991 | 11 November 1994 | 3 years, 194 days | 158 | 59 | 47 | 52 | 37.3 | – | |
| Ray Wilkins | England | 15 November 1994 | 4 September 1996 | 1 year, 294 days | 80 | 31 | 13 | 36 | 38.8 | – | |
| Stewart Houston | Scotland | 16 September 1996 | 10 November 1997 | 1 year, 55 days | 63 | 25 | 15 | 23 | 39.7 | – | |
| Ray Harford | England | 5 December 1997 | 28 September 1998 | 297 days | 41 | 5 | 18 | 18 | 12.2 | – | |
| Gerry Francis | England | 16 October 1998 | 25 February 2001 | 2 years, 132 days | 125 | 36 | 42 | 47 | 28.8 | – | |
| Ian Holloway | England | 26 February 2001 | 2 February 2006 | 4 years, 341 days | 252 | 100 | 71 | 81 | 39.7 | Football League Division Two runners-up 2003/04 | |
| Gary Waddock | (Republic of Ireland) Ireland | 6 February 2006 | 19 September 2006 | 225 days | 23 | 4 | 8 | 11 | 17.4 | – | |
| John Gregory | England | 20 September 2006 | 1 October 2007 | 1 year, 11 days | 48 | 13 | 12 | 23 | 27.1 | – | |
| Mick Harford | England | 1 October 2007 | 29 October 2007 | 28 days | 5 | 2 | 2 | 1 | 40.2 | – | |
| Luigi De Canio | Italy | 29 October 2007 | 12 May 2008 | 196 days | 35 | 12 | 11 | 12 | 34.3 | First manager from outside UK & Ireland | |
| Iain Dowie | Northern Ireland | 14 May 2008 | 24 October 2008 | 163 days | 15 | 8 | 3 | 4 | 53.3 | Highest win percentage of any QPR manager. | |
| Paulo Sousa | Portugal | 19 November 2008 | 9 April 2009 | 141 days | 26 | 7 | 12 | 7 | 26.9 | – | |
| Jim Magilton | Northern Ireland | 3 June 2009 | 16 December 2009 | 227 days | 24 | 9 | 8 | 7 | 37.5 | – | |
| Paul Hart | England | 17 December 2009 | 15 January 2010 | 29 days | 5 | 1 | 2 | 2 | 20.0 | – | |
| Mick Harford | England | 15 January 2010 | 2 March 2010 | 46 days | 7 | 1 | 0 | 6 | 14.3 | – | |
| Neil Warnock | England | 2 March 2010 | 8 January 2012 | 1 year, 312 days | 84 | 33 | 27 | 24 | 39.2 | Football League Championship champions | |
| Mark Hughes | Wales | 10 January 2012 | 23 November 2012 | 318 days | 32 | 8 | 6 | 18 | 25.0 | – | |
| Harry Redknapp | England | 24 November 2012 | 3 February 2015 | 2 years, 71 days | 103 | 36 | 26 | 41 | 35.0 | Championship Play Off winners 2013/14 | |
| Chris Ramsey | England | 12 February 2015 | 4 November 2015 | 206 days | 30 | 8 | 6 | 16 | 26.7 | – | |
| Jimmy Floyd Hasselbaink | Netherlands | 4 December 2015 | 5 November 2016 | 337 days | 38 | 11 | 15 | 12 | 28.9 | – | |
| Ian Holloway | England | 11 November 2016 | 10 May 2018 | 1 year, 180 days | 80 | 26 | 14 | 40 | 32.5 | – | |
| Steve McClaren | England | 18 May 2018 | 1 April 2019 | 318 days | 46 | 16 | 9 | 21 | 34.8 | – | |
| Mark Warburton | England | 8 May 2019 | 1 June 2022 | 3 years, 24 days | 150 | 56 | 35 | 59 | 37.3 | – | |
| Michael Beale | England | 1 June 2022 | 28 November 2022 | 180 days | 22 | 9 | 5 | 8 | 40.9 | – | |
| Neil Critchley | England | 11 December 2022 | 19 February 2023 | 70 days | 12 | 1 | 5 | 6 | 8.33 | Lowest win percentage of any permanent QPR manager. | |
| Gareth Ainsworth | England | 21 February 2023 | 28 October 2023 | 249 days | 28 | 5 | 4 | 19 | 17.9 | – | |
| Martí Cifuentes | Spain | 30 October 2023 | 24 June 2025 | 2 years, 184 days | 82 | 28 | 23 | 31 | 34.14 | – | |
| Julien Stéphan | France | 25 June 2025 | Present | 311 days | 48 | 16 | 10 | 22 | 33.33 | – | |

== Notes ==
- A The winning percentage listed is rounded to one decimal place.
