= List of space travellers by first flight =

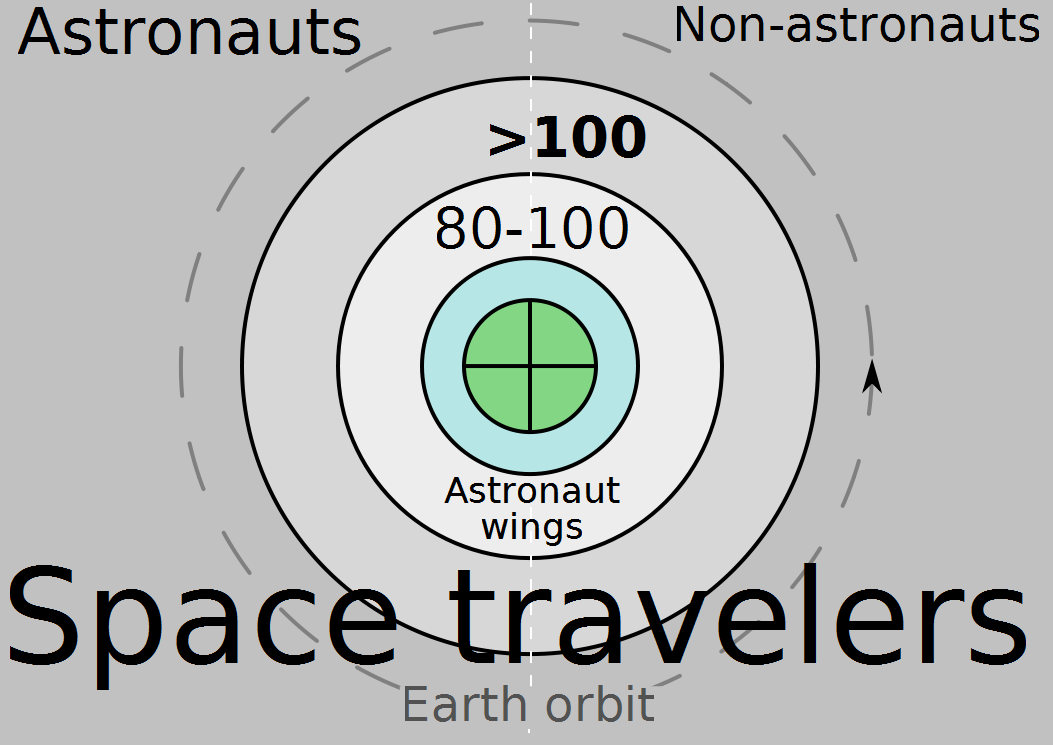
The Fédération Aéronautique Internationale (FAI) defines spaceflight as any flight over 100 kilometres in altitude – the two grey-shaded regions.

This is a list of space travelers by first flight. The table is listed in chronological order from the date of first flight. The table adheres to a common definition of a space traveller; the Fédération Aéronautique Internationale criterion of achieving an altitude higher than 100 km (62 mi; 330,000 ft), thereby crossing the FAI-defined Kármán line. The criteria for determining who has achieved human spaceflight vary. Personnel who qualify only for the United States Astronaut Badge, awarded to those who achieve an altitude of 50 mi (80 km; 264,000 ft), are listed at the X-15's highest flights and the VSS Unity test flights.

== Space travellers ==
=== Table parameters ===
Legend
Italics	Sub-orbital spaceflights that crossed 100 km (62 mi).
◉	After the name, denotes sub-orbital space travellers who have flown into orbit on a subsequent space flight.
△	After the name, denotes space travellers who have flown to the Moon without landing.
▲	After the name, denotes space travellers who have walked on the Moon.
‡	After the name, denotes those who died during their first spaceflight. (Note: Fatalities which occurred during training or testing are not included in this list, but can be found in the list of spaceflight-related accidents and incidents.)
†	After the name, denotes those who died during a subsequent spaceflight.
⊗	After the name, denotes those whose first spaceflight had begun and was clearly intended (Note: i.e. In a class of vehicle that had already been flight-proven above 100 km (62 mi), for most of its launches.) to cross 100 km (62 mi), but failed to do so.
Linked country	In the 'Nationality' column, denotes the first from that country to pass 100 km (62 mi). (Note: In cases where the first space traveller from a particular country flew on a sub-orbital flight, that flight is also linked in italics.)
Unlinked name	Subsequent table entry for a space traveller who made or attempted a previous spaceflight. (Note: Most space travellers have a single entry in the table dated on the launch of their first spaceflight or attempt thereof. The only exception is when a traveller successfully crossed 100 km (62 mi) for the first time after a failed attempt.)

All entries are dated from launch time in Coordinated Universal Time (UTC), which on occasion is one day earlier than the local date of launches from sites in the Eastern Hemisphere such as Baikonur and one day later than the local date of launches from sites in the Western Hemisphere such as Cape Canaveral.

As a rule, dual nationals fly under a single flag when flying as professional spacecrew and/or when flying on government-operated spacecraft, and this is the flag they are listed under in the table. For the spaceflights of dual nationals who are private citizens flying on commercial spacecraft as ordinary passengers, the flags displayed are those of their countries of birth, unless the space traveller did not hold citizenship of that country and/or otherwise made clear they intended to represent a different nationality.

=== Table ===
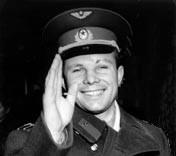
Yuri Gagarin, the first person in space and in orbit.

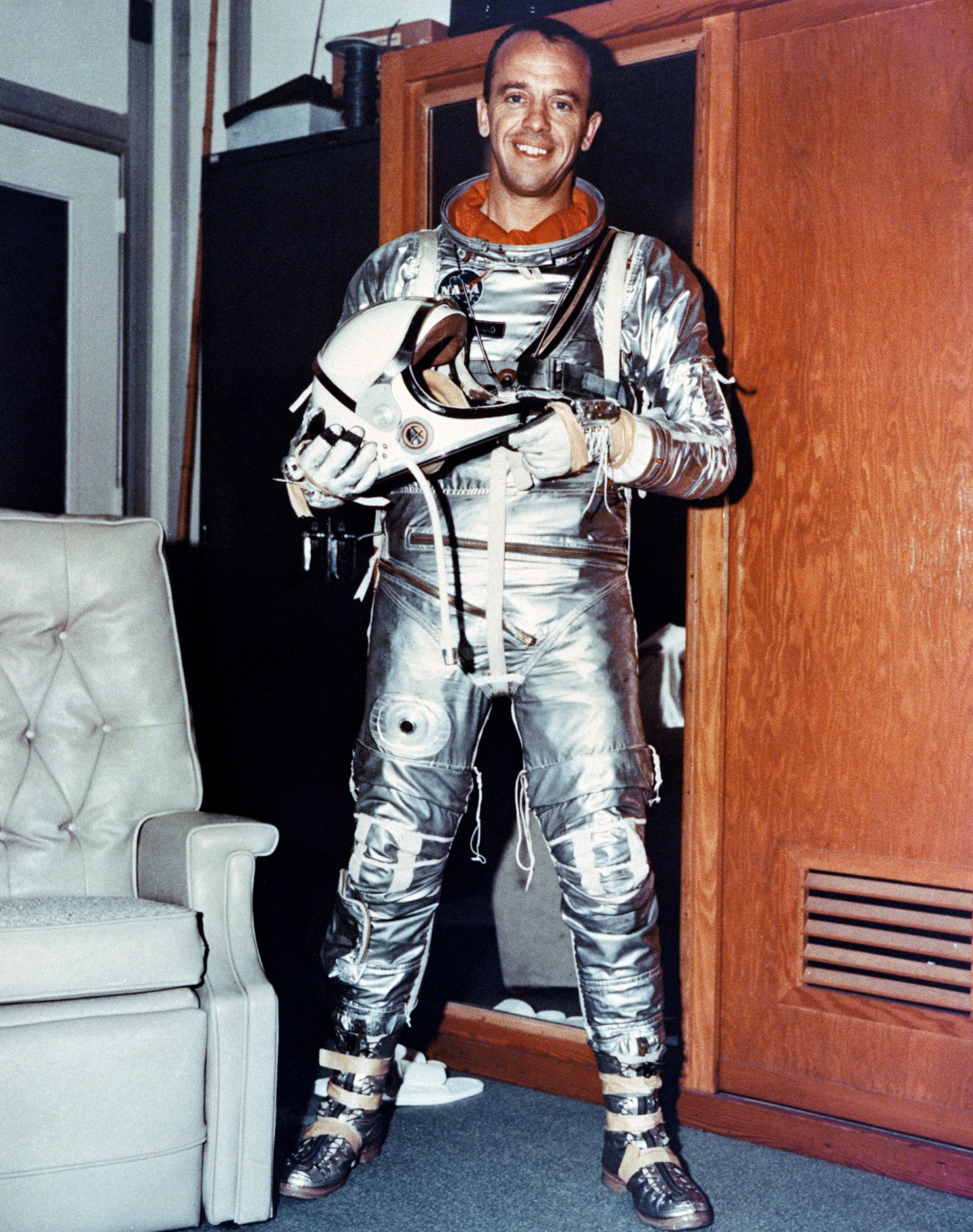
Alan Shepard, the first American and the second person in space.

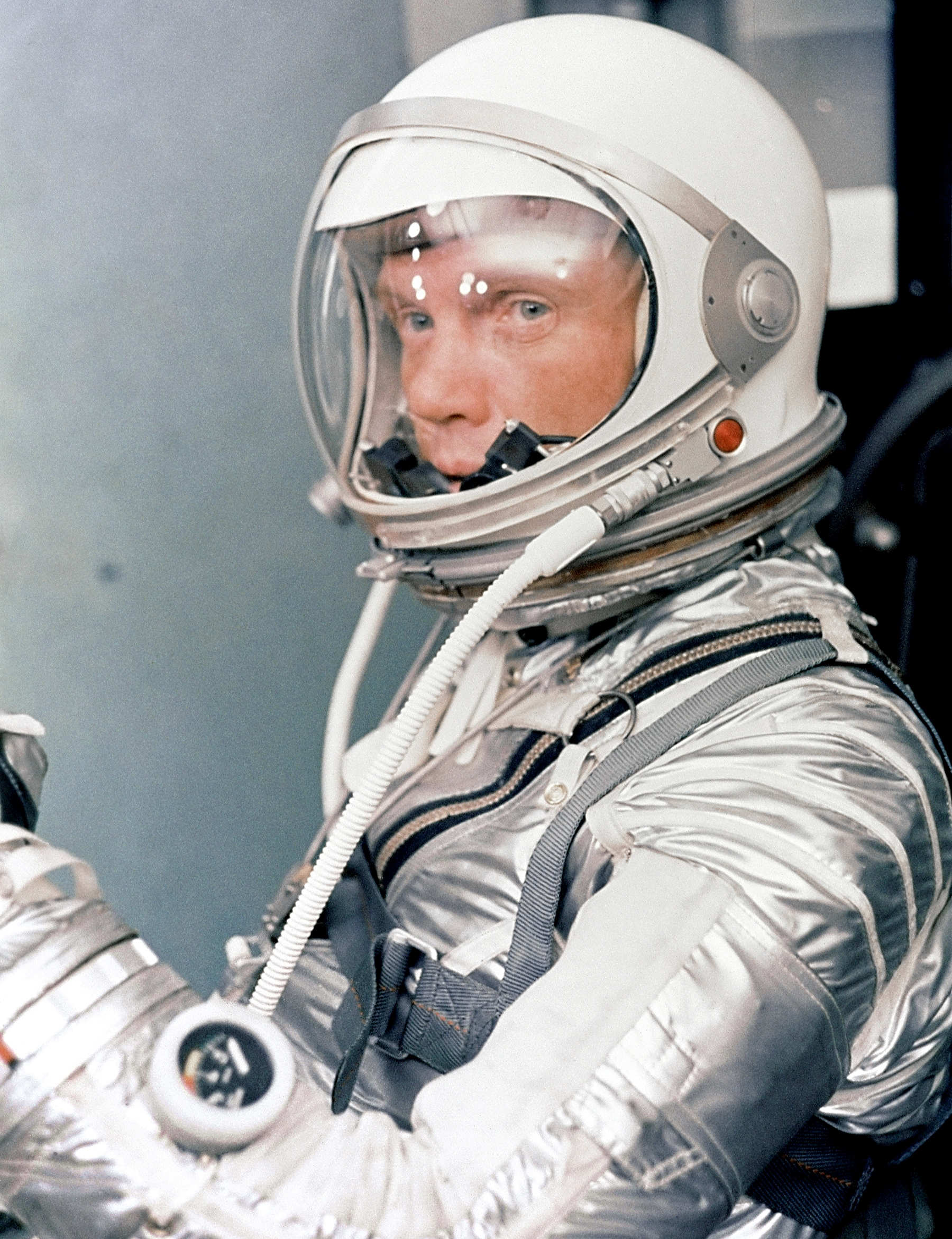
John Glenn, the first American to orbit the Earth and 5th person in space.

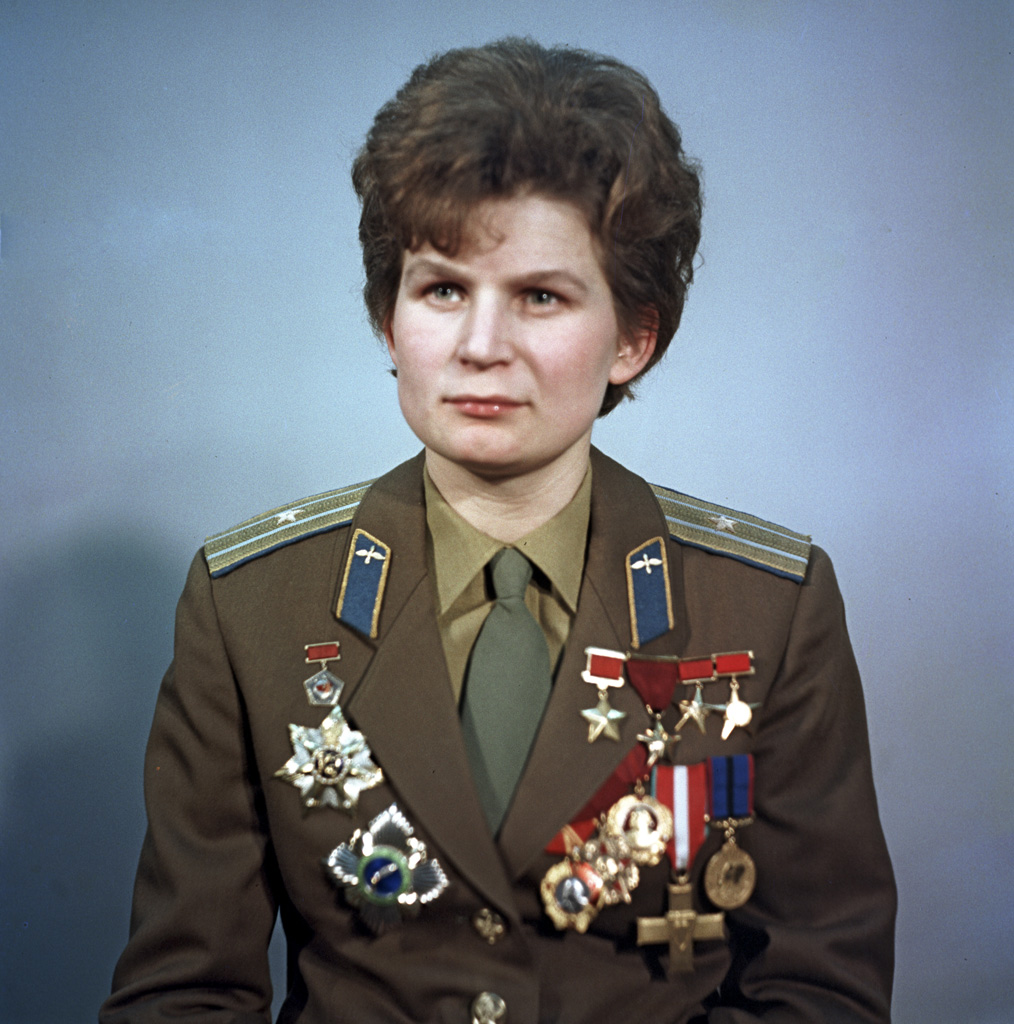
Valentina Tereshkova, the first woman and 12th person in space.

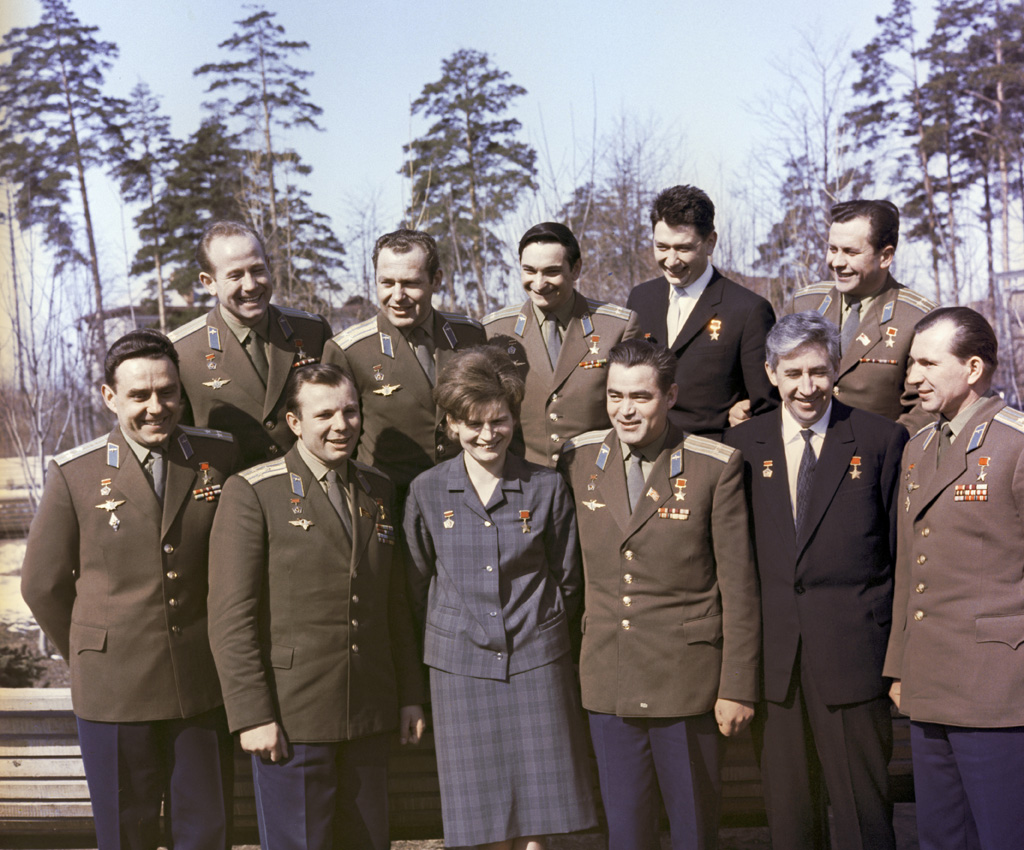
Vladimir Komarov, joint 14th person and first to die during spaceflight (during Soyuz 1).

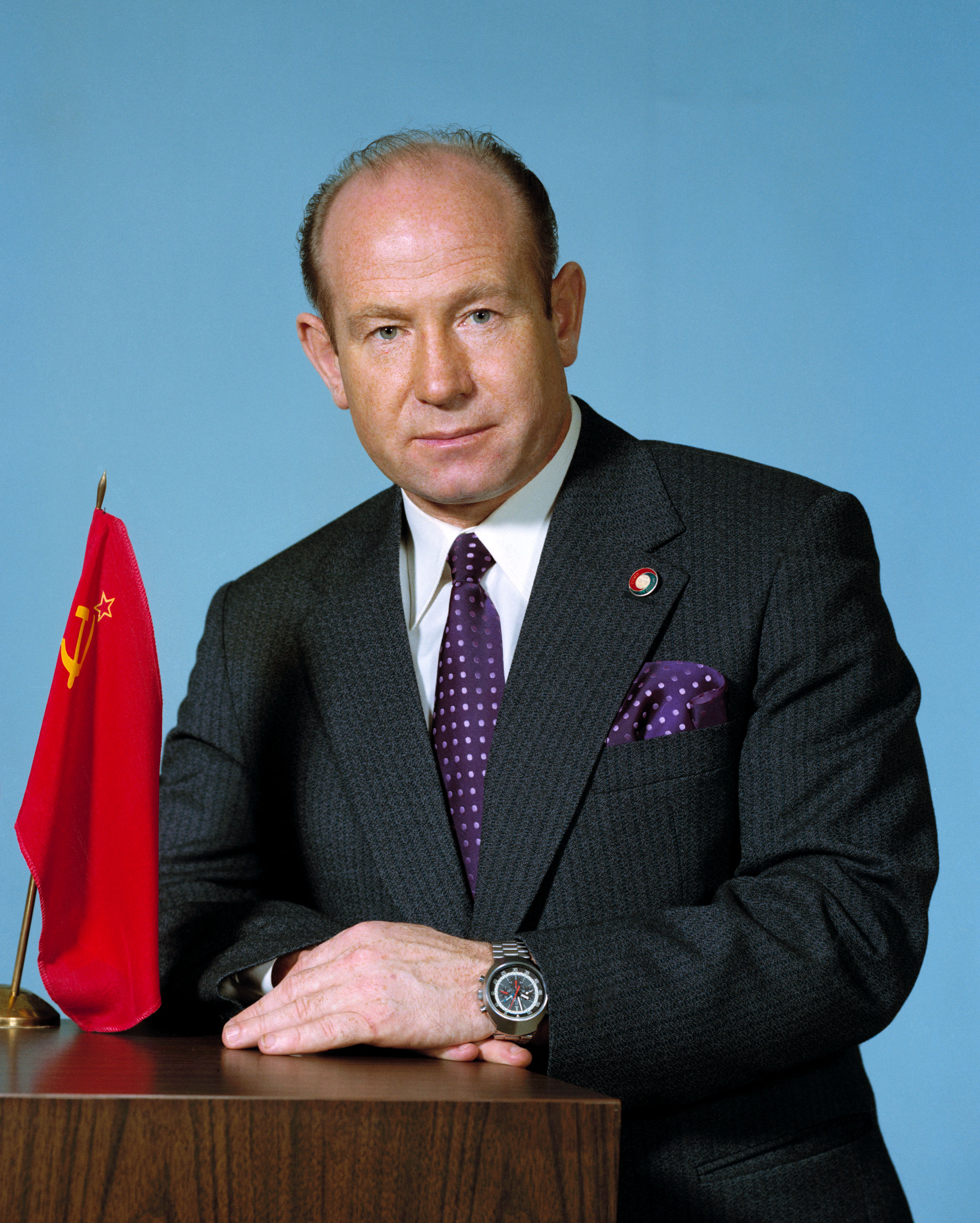
Alexei Leonov, joint 17th in space and first to perform an EVA.

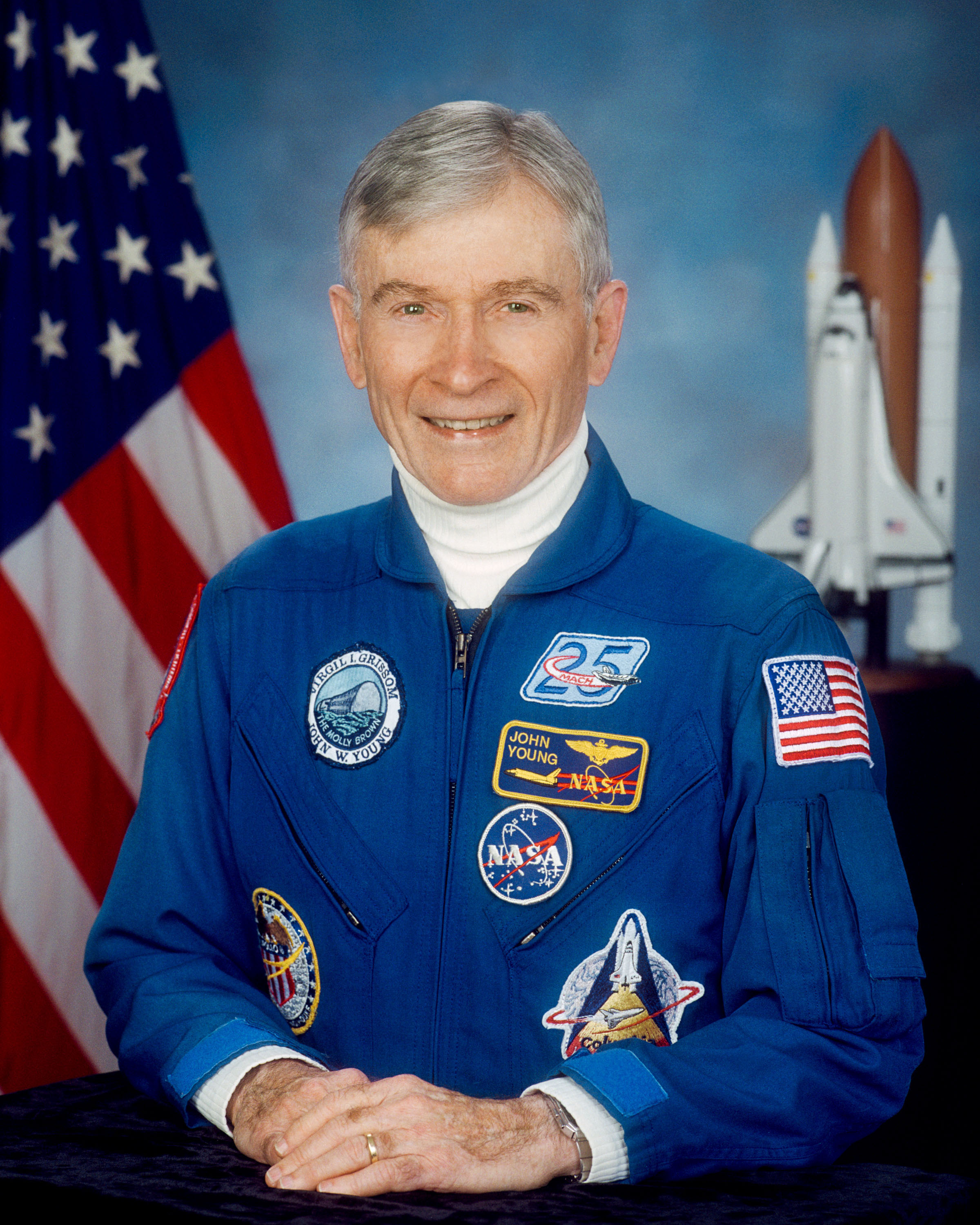
John Young, 19th person in space, first to fly solo around the Moon and first to command a Space Shuttle.

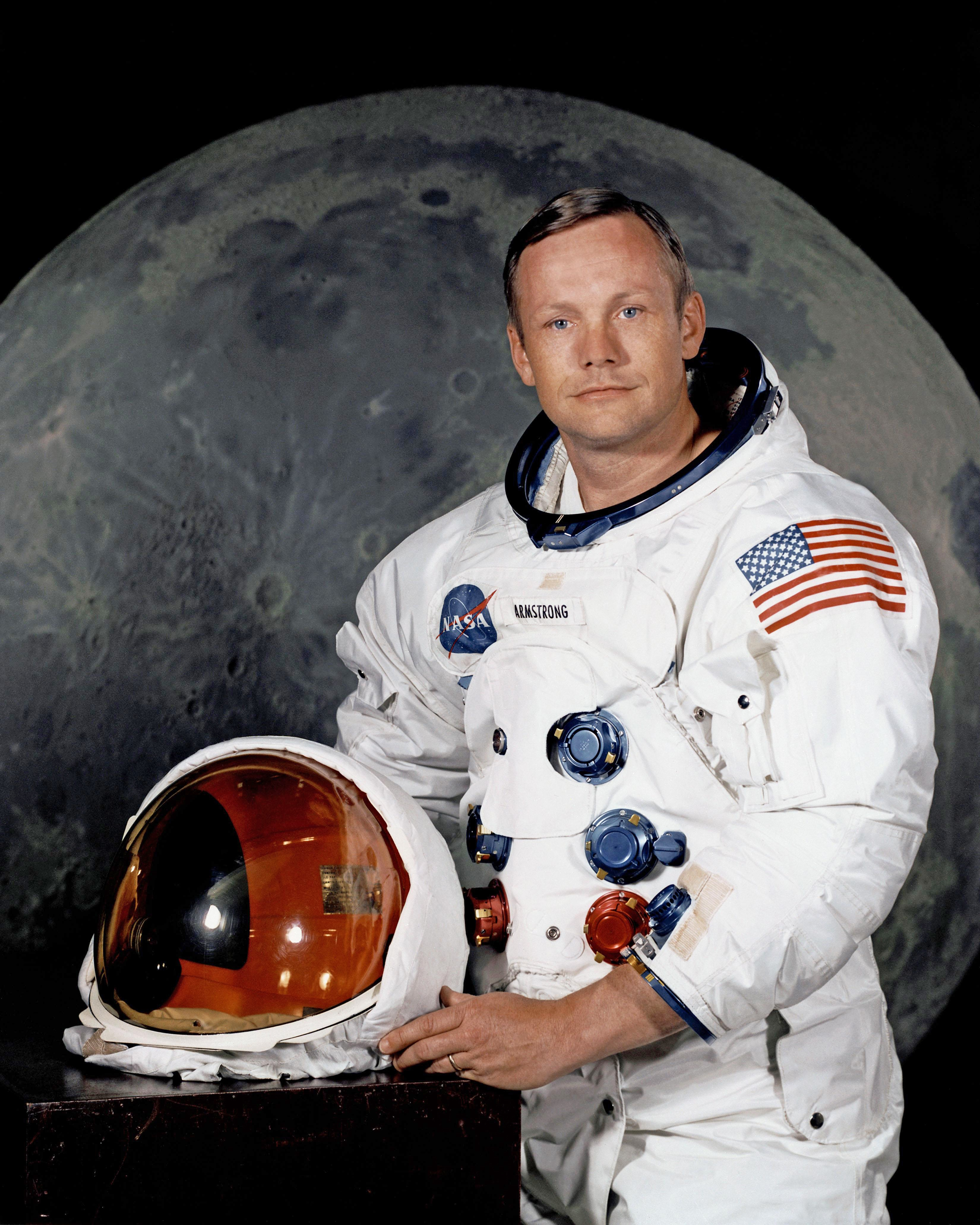
Neil Armstrong, joint 26th person in space and first to set foot on the Moon

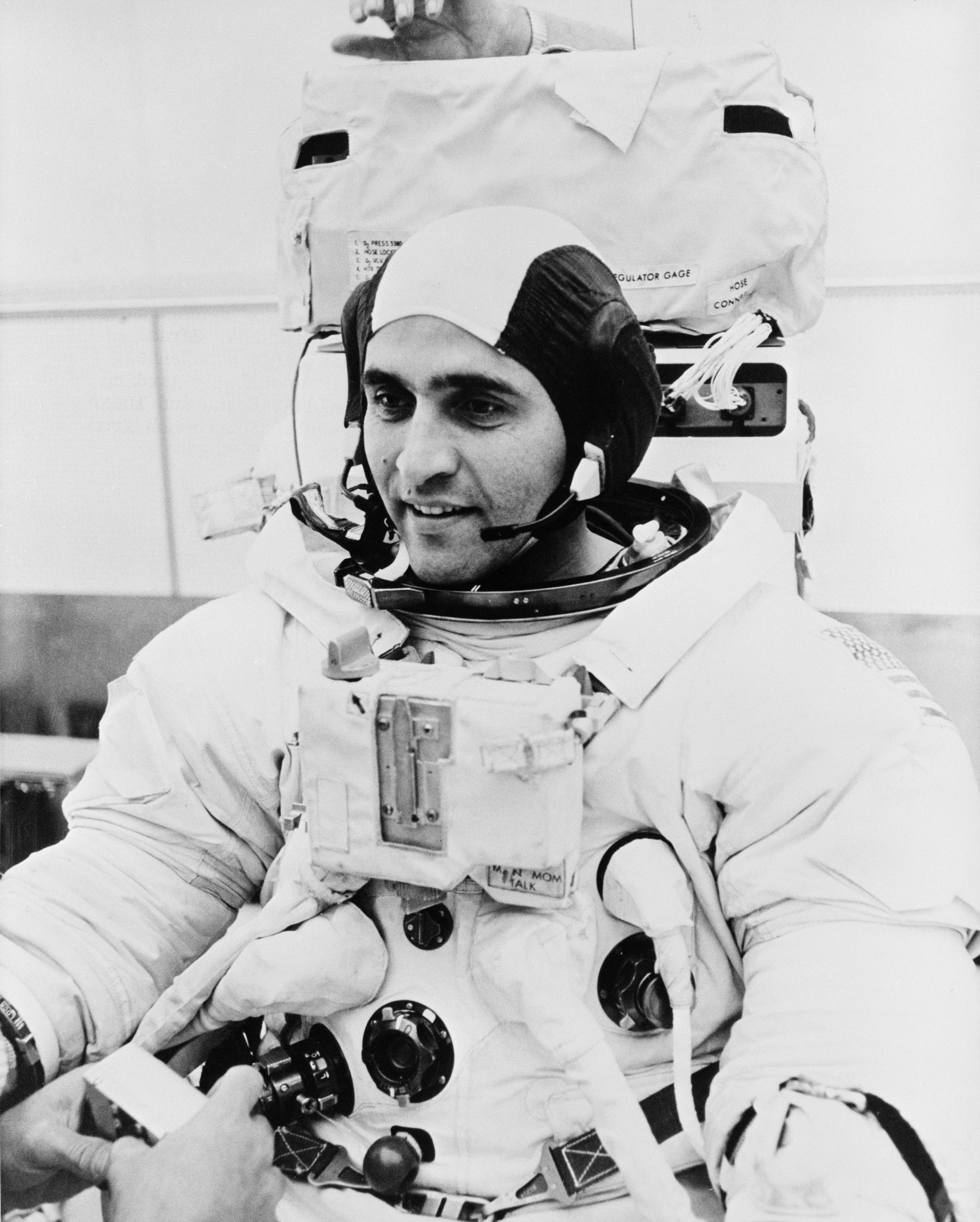
Harrison Schmitt, joint 59th person in space. The most recent person and first geologist to have arrived on the Moon

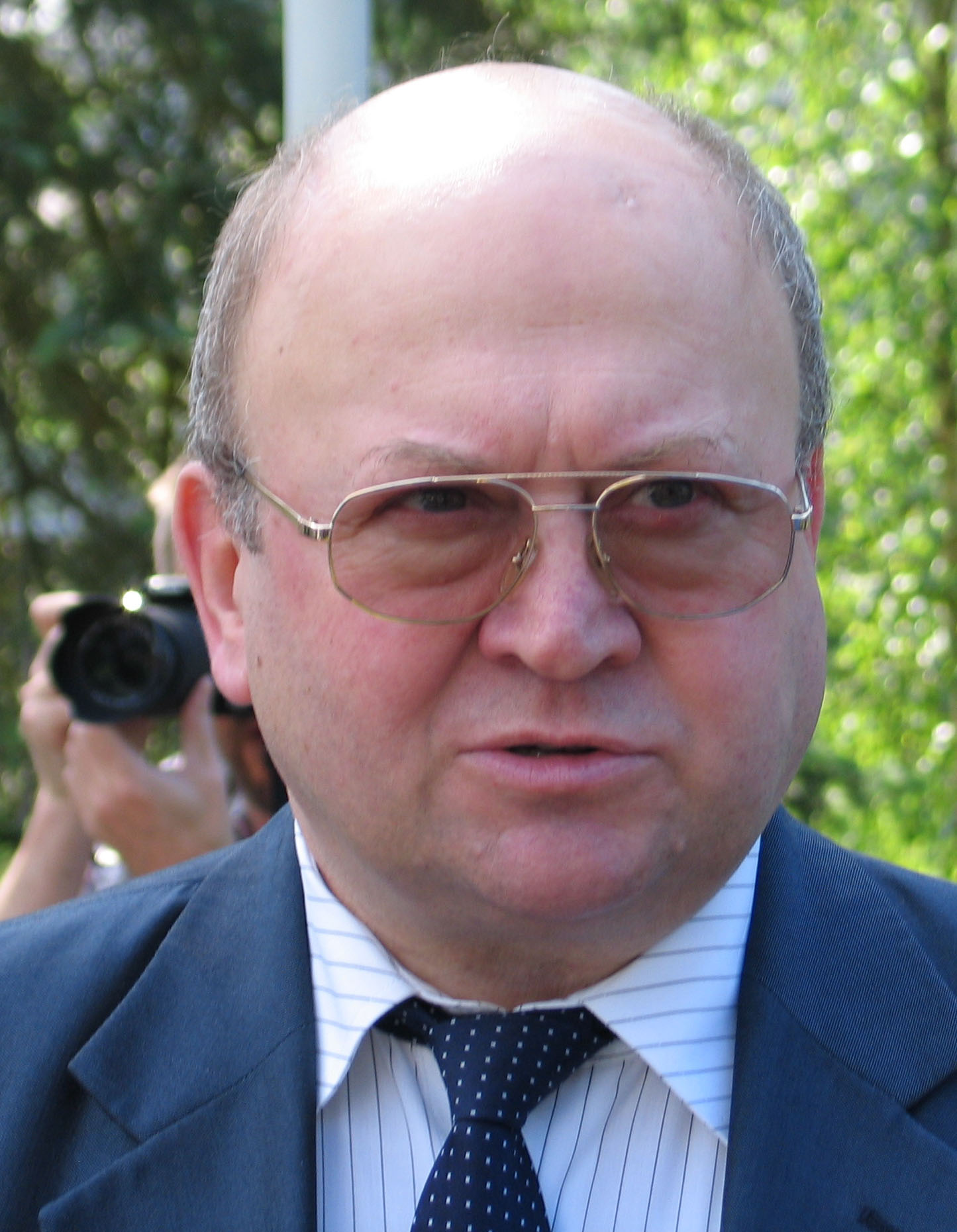
Vladimír Remek, 88th person in space and the first from a country other than the US or the Soviet Union

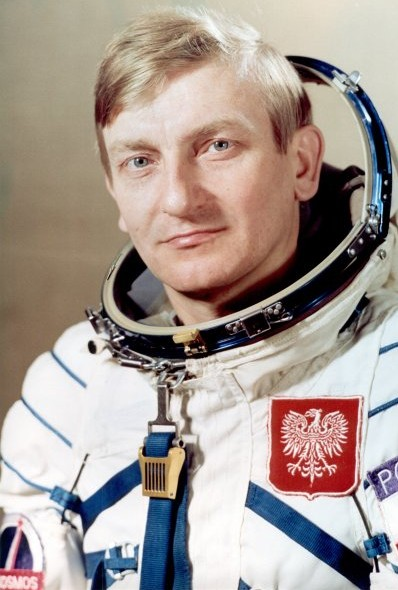
Miroslaw Hermaszewski, 90th person and first Polish in space

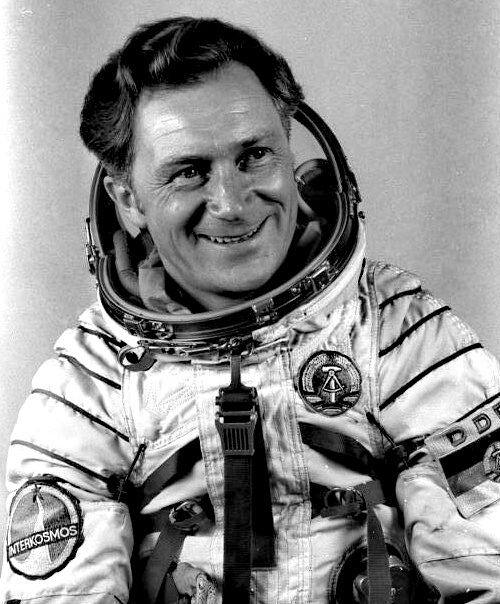
Sigmund Jähn, 91st person in space and the first German

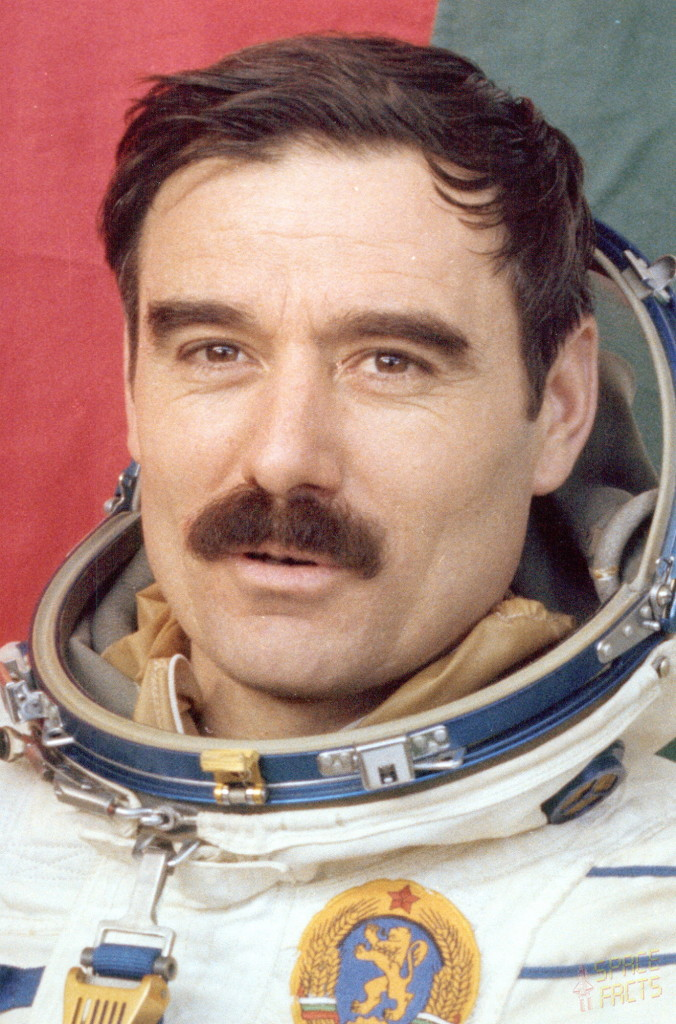
Georgi Ivanov, 93rd person in space and the first Bulgarian

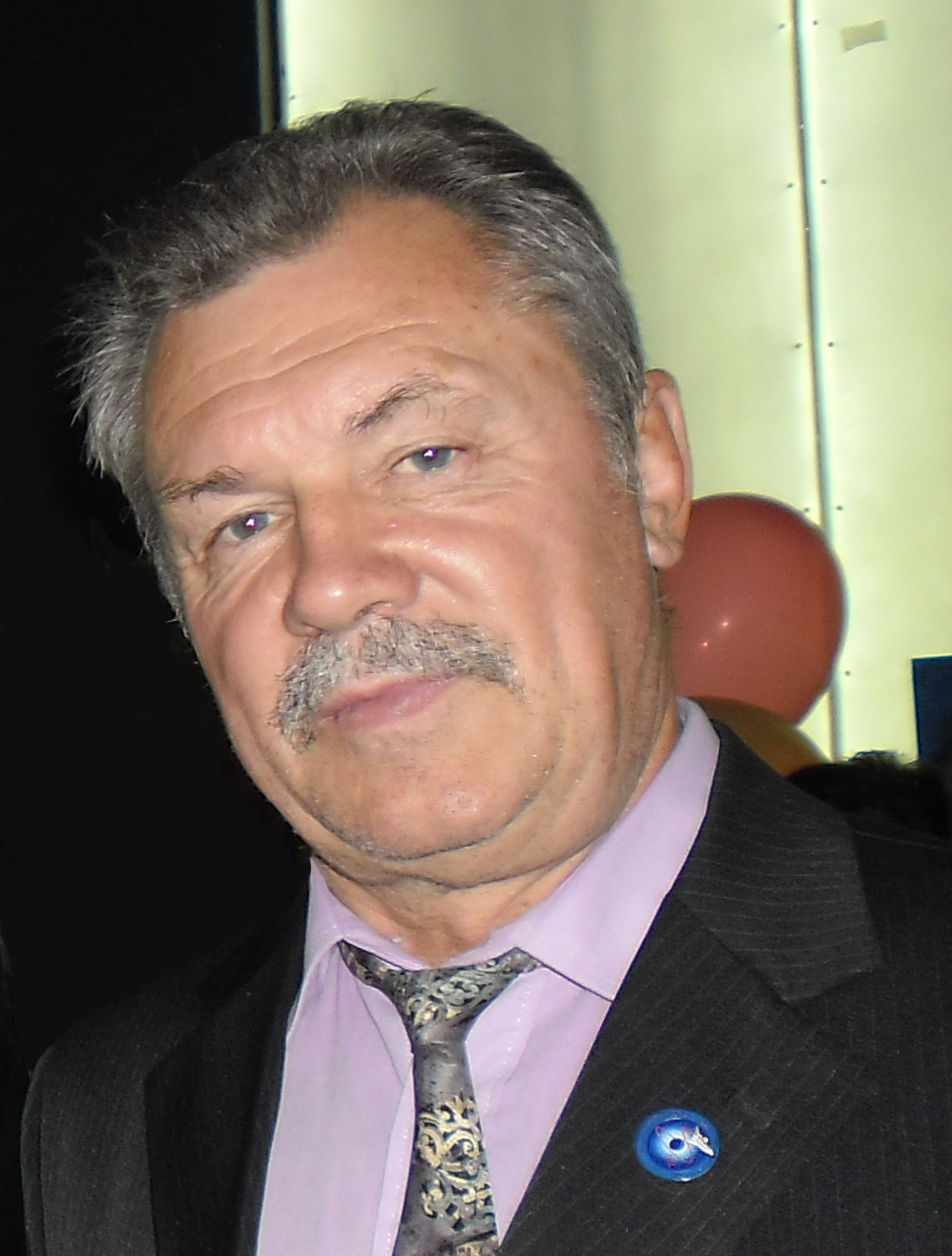
Bertalan Farkas, 95th person and first Hungarian in space

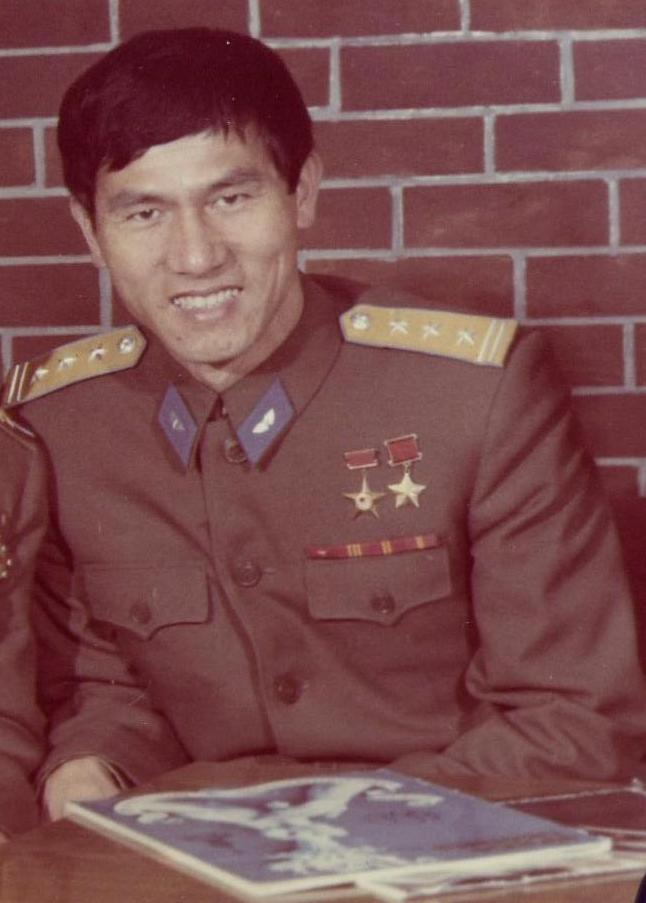
Phạm Tuân, 97th person in space, and the first from an Asian country (Vietnam)

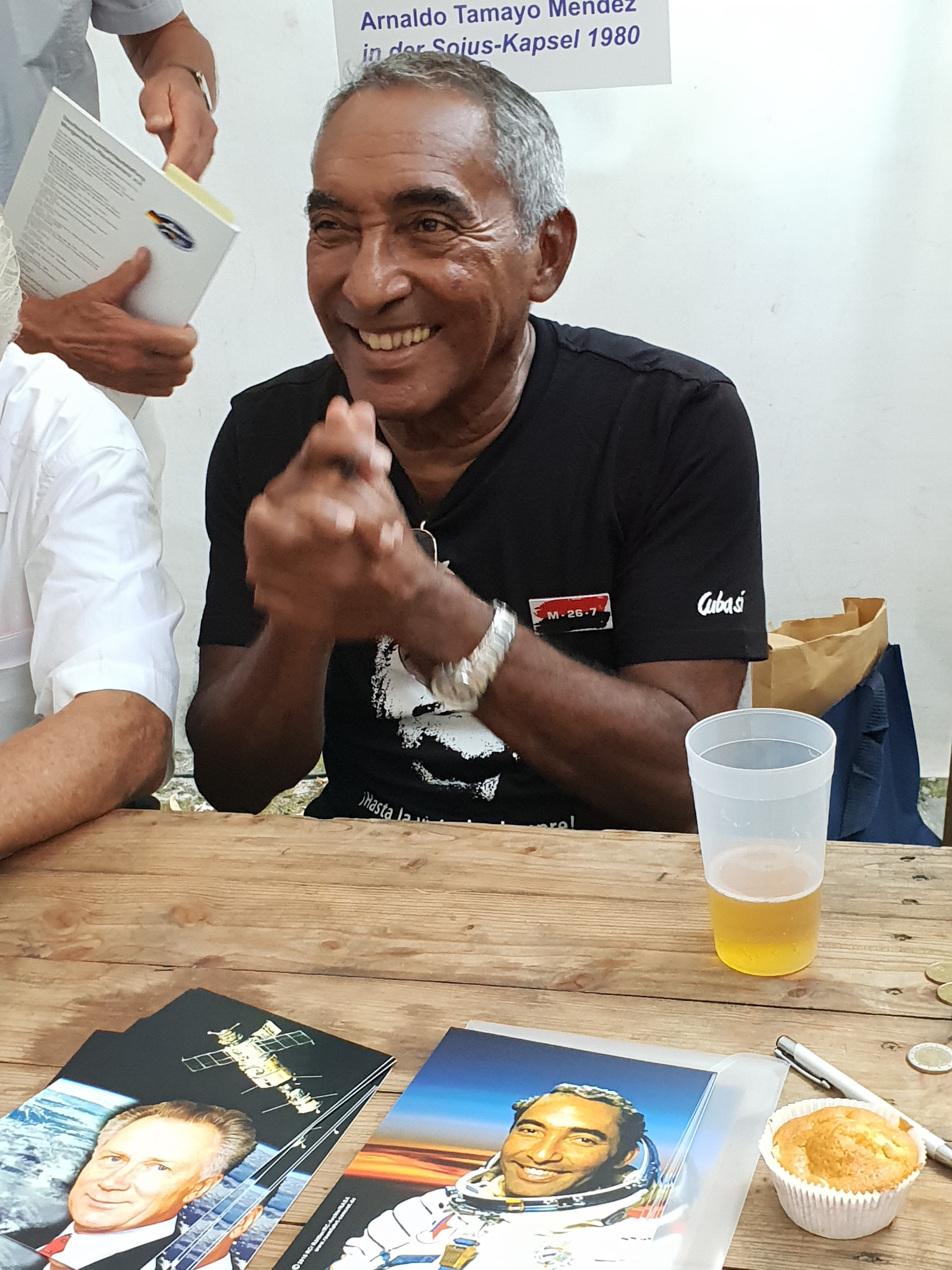
Arnaldo Tamayo Méndez, 98th person and first Cuban in space

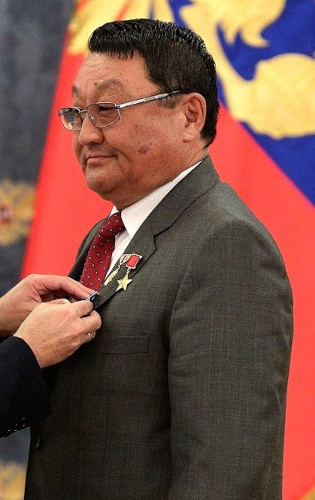
Jügderdemidiin Gürragchaa, 102nd person and first Mongolian in space

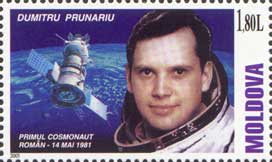
Dumitru Prunariu, 104th person and first Romanian in space

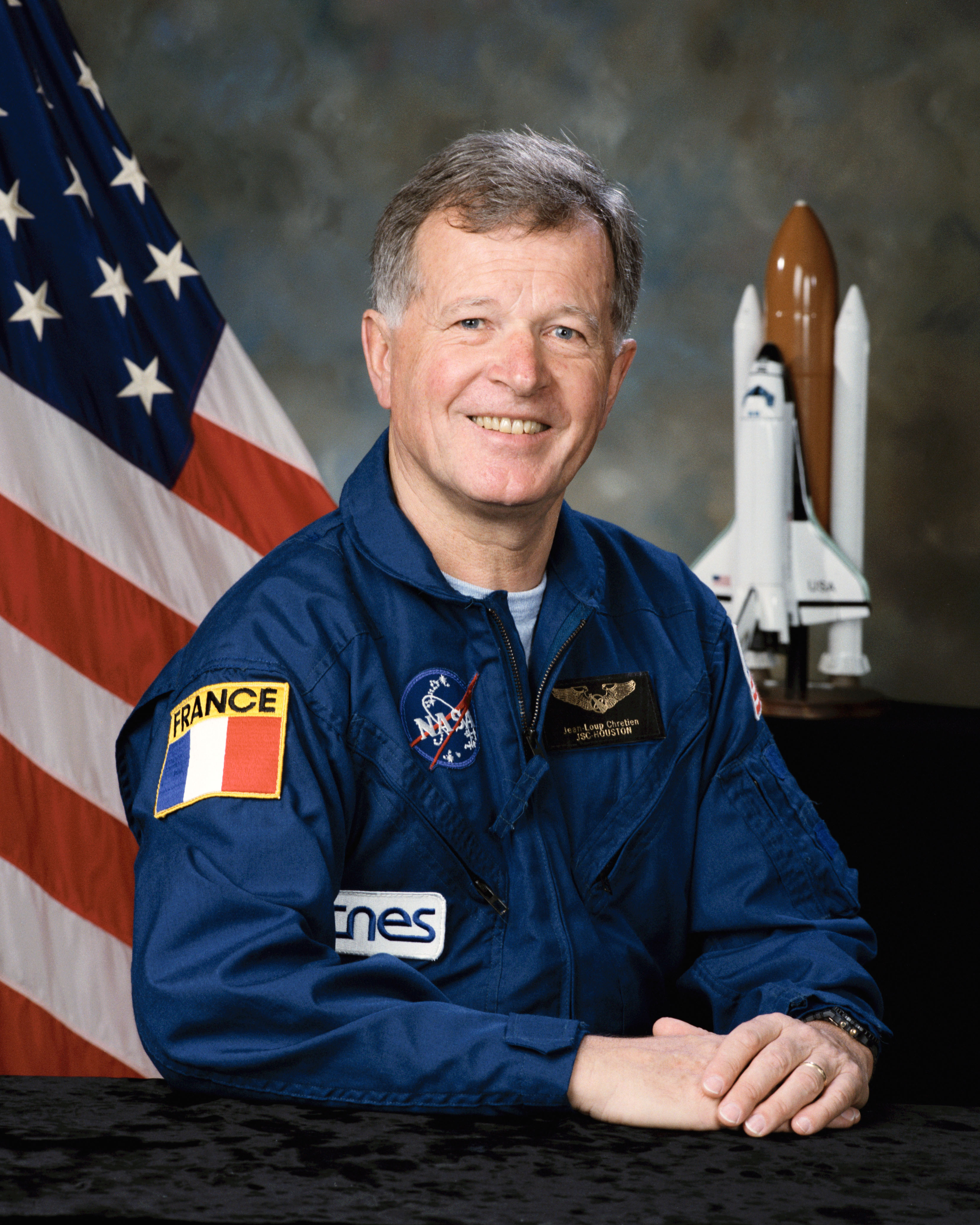
Jean-Loup Chrétien, joint 109th person and first French in space

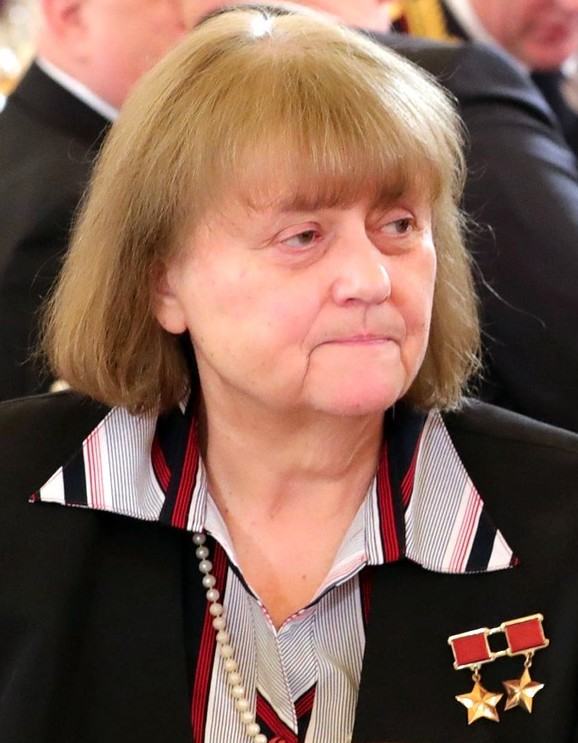
Svetlana Savitskaya, joint 111th person in space and the first woman to perform a spacewalk.

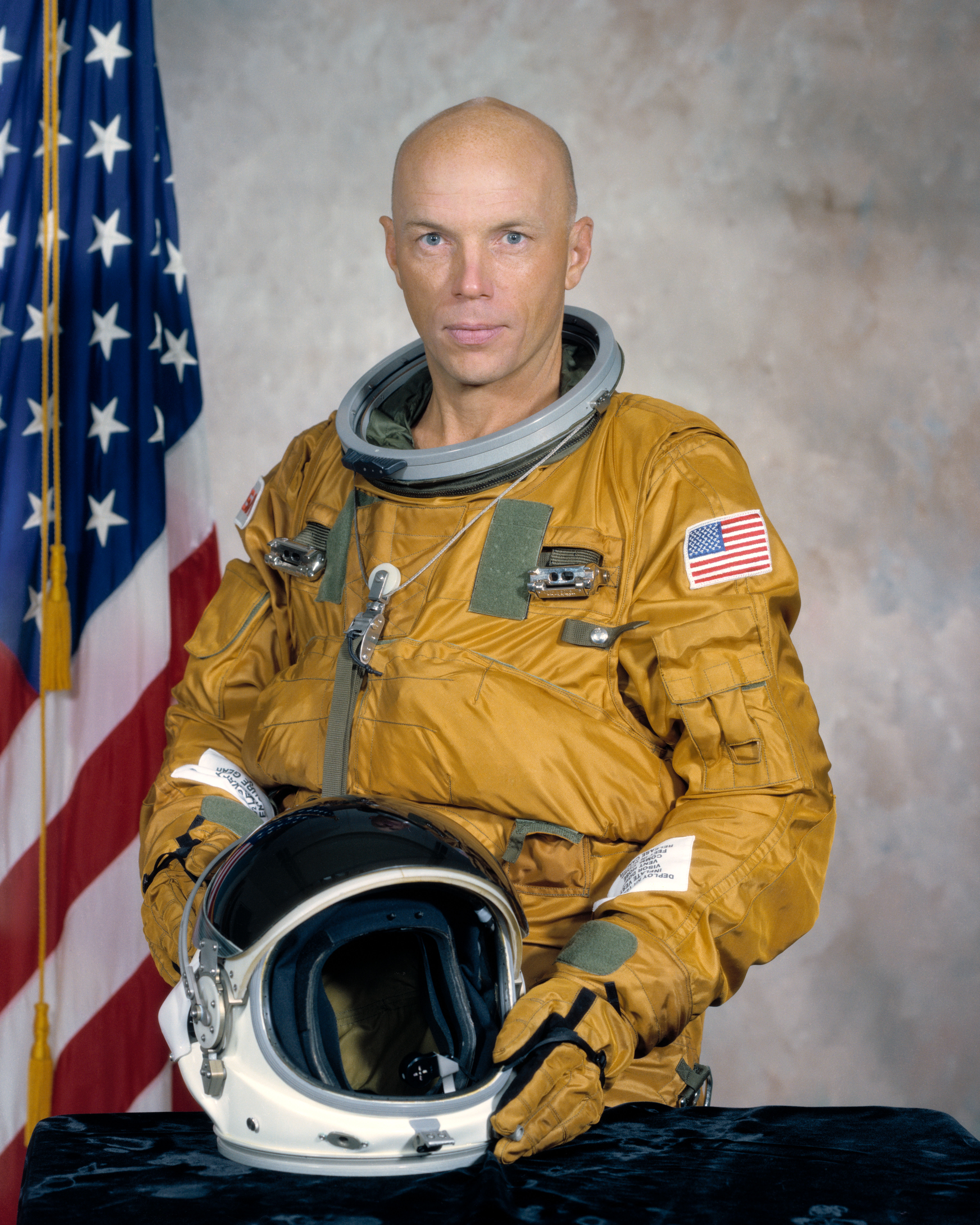
Story Musgrave, joint 116th person in space and the only person to have flown on all five NASA Space Shuttles.

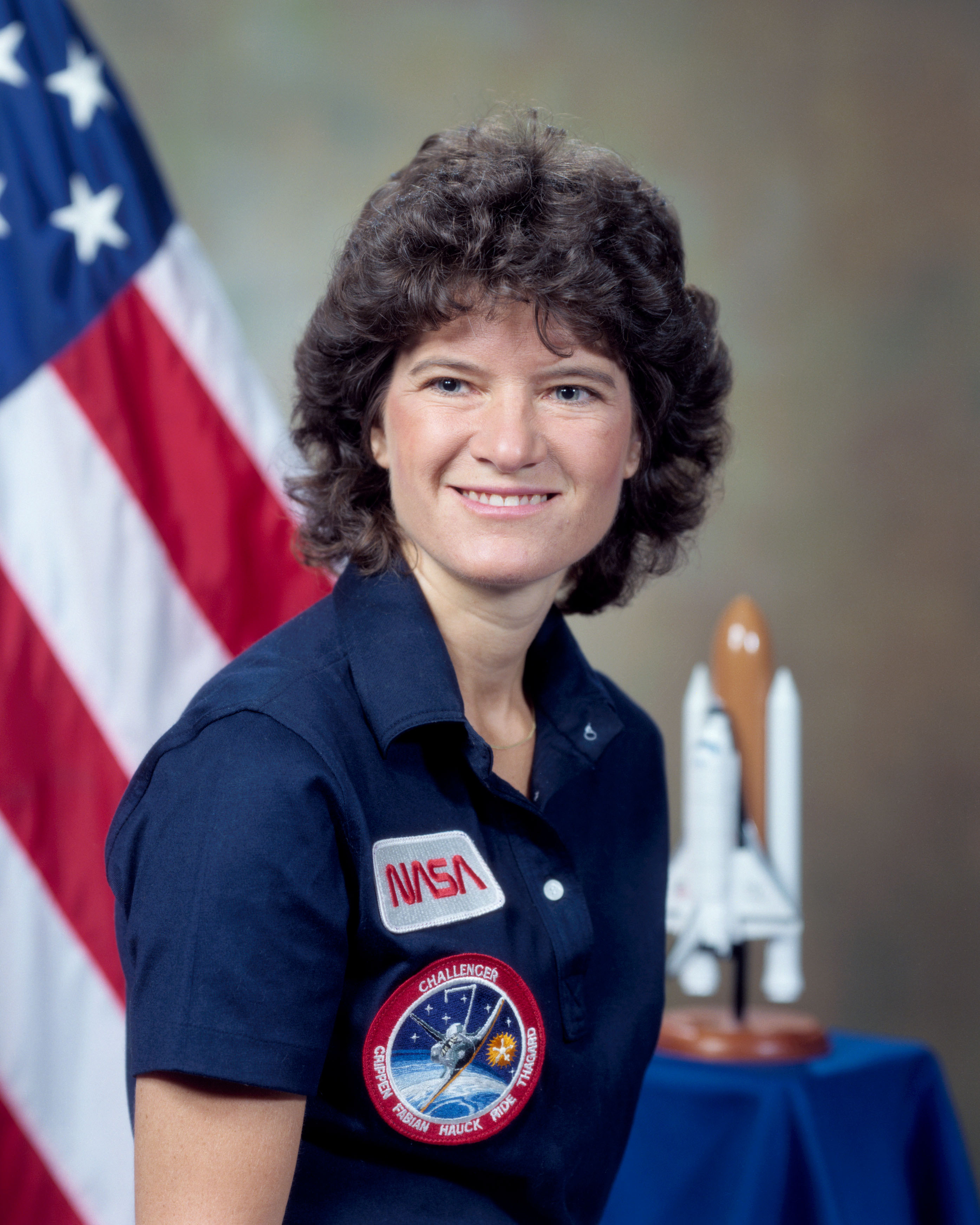
Sally Ride, joint 120th person and the first American woman in space

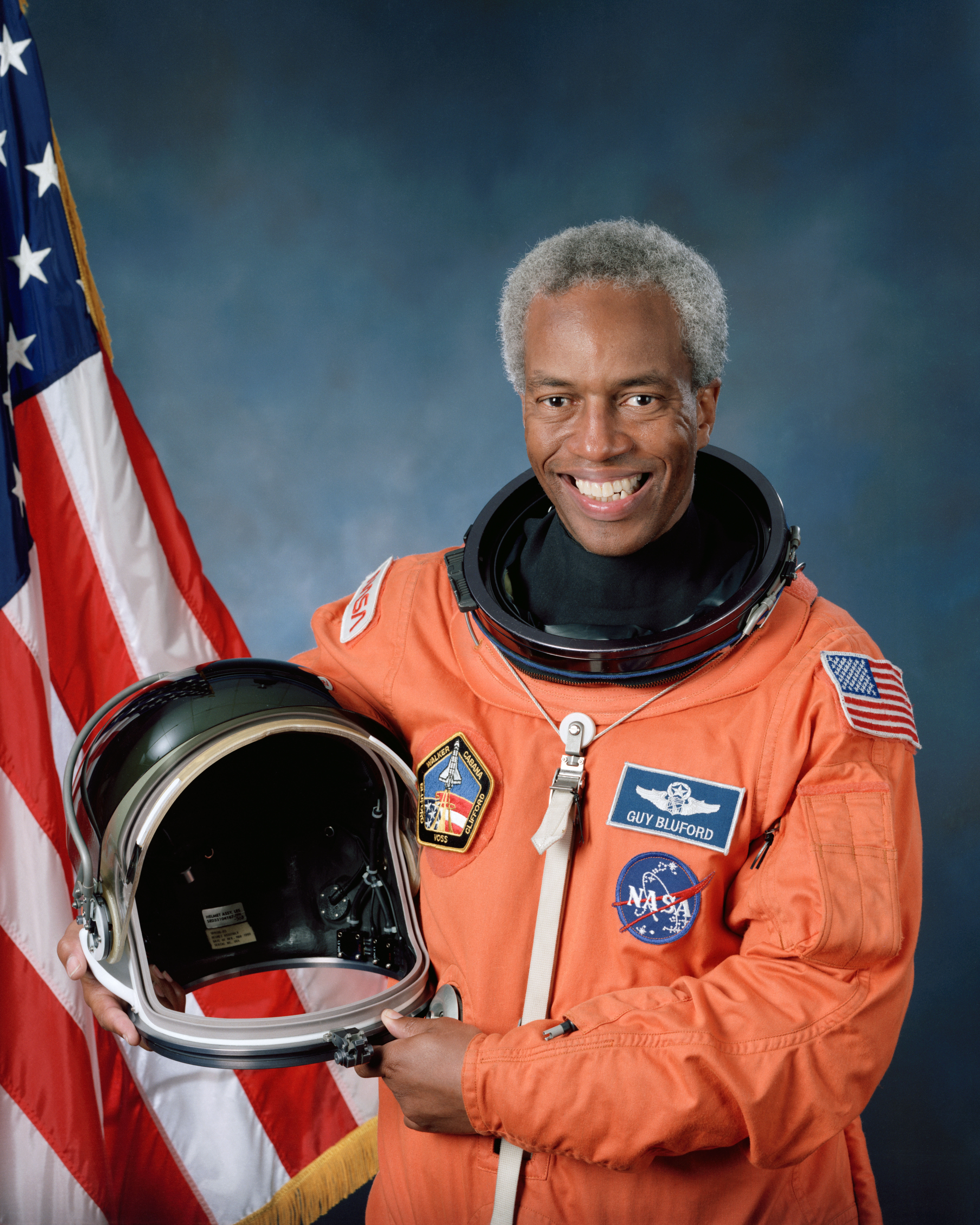
Guion Bluford, joint 125th person and the first African American in space

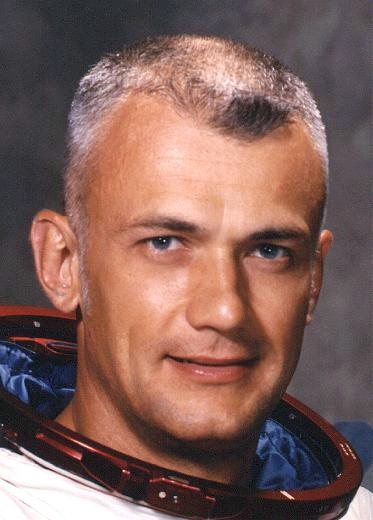
Bruce McCandless, joint 133rd person in space and the first to perform an untethered EVA

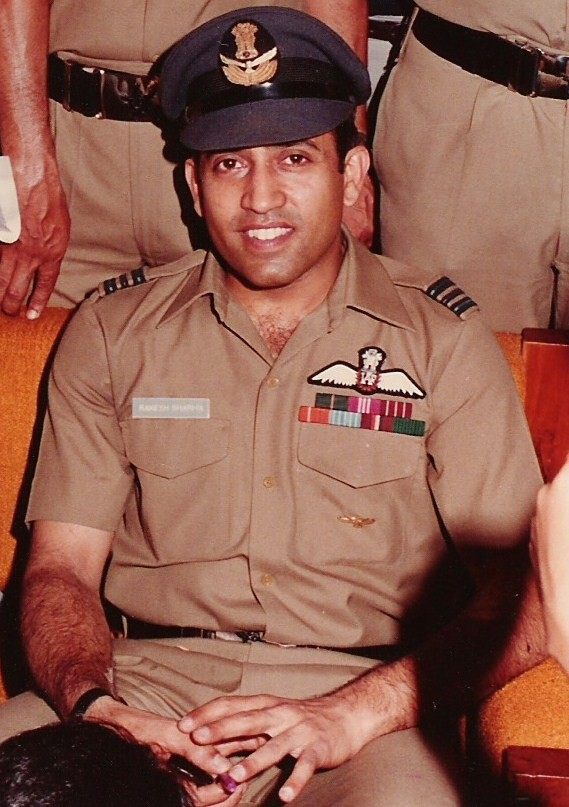
Rakesh Sharma, 139th person and the first Indian in space

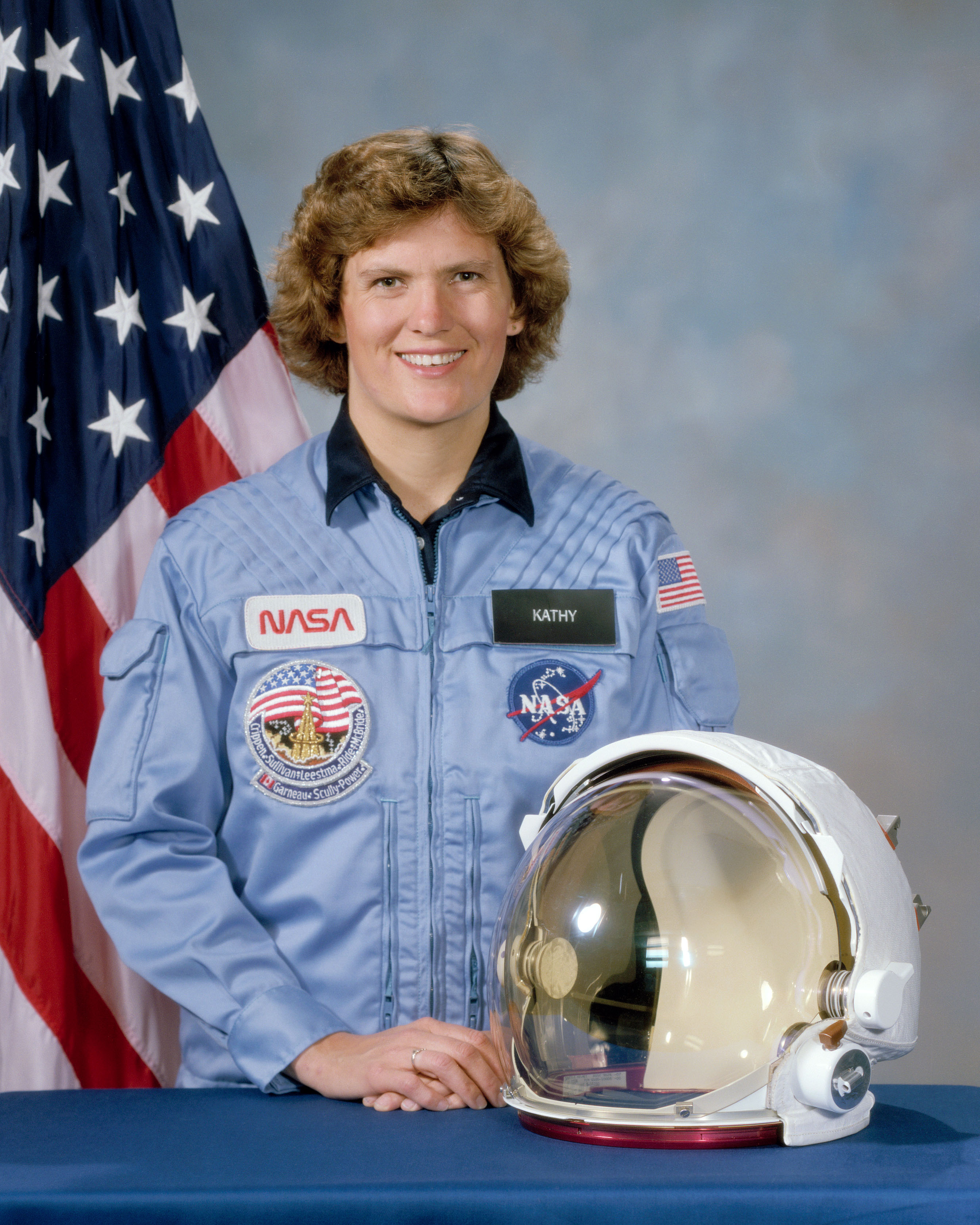
Kathryn D. Sullivan, joint 154th person in space and the first American woman to perform an EVA.

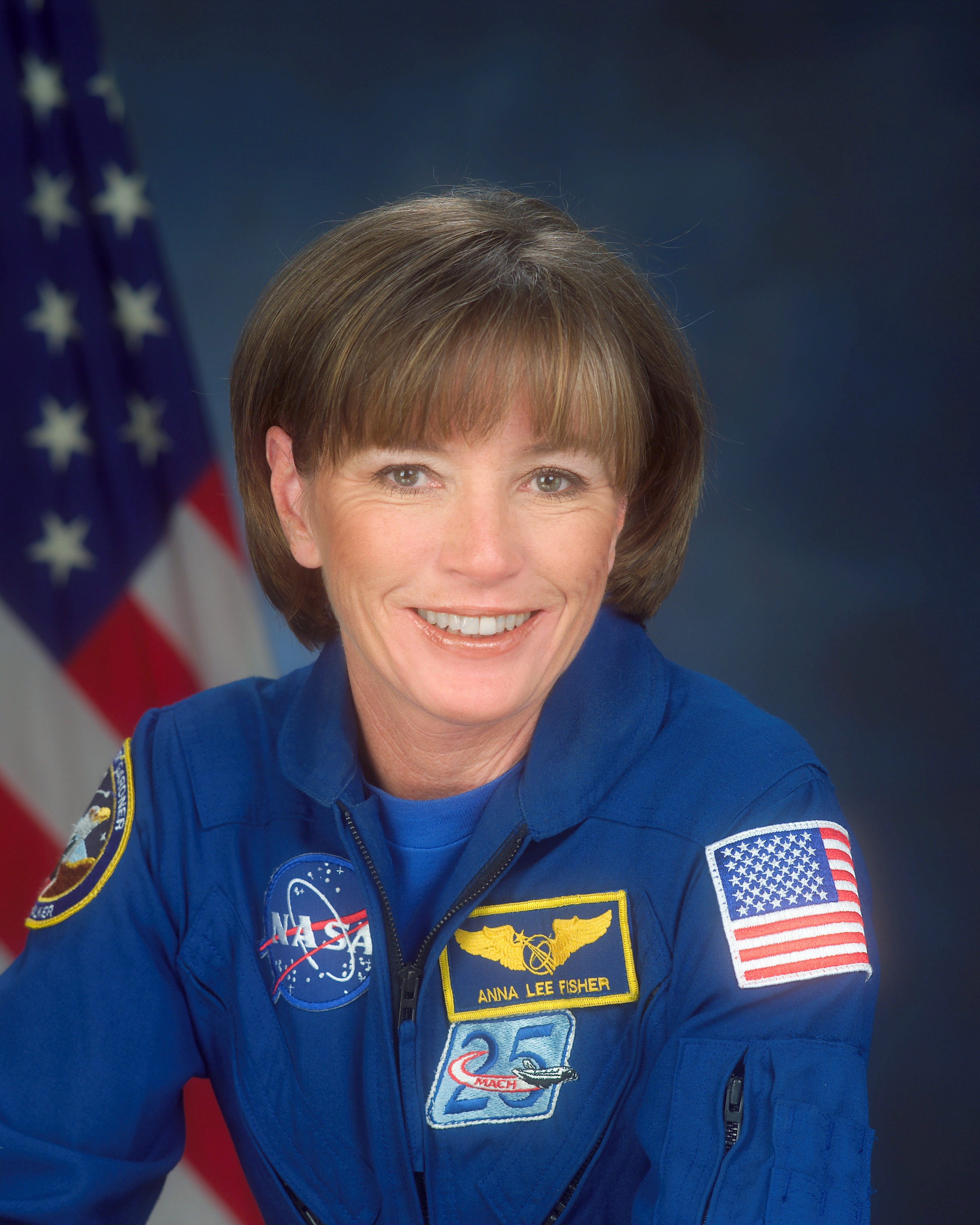
Anna Lee Fisher, joint 155th person and the first mother in space

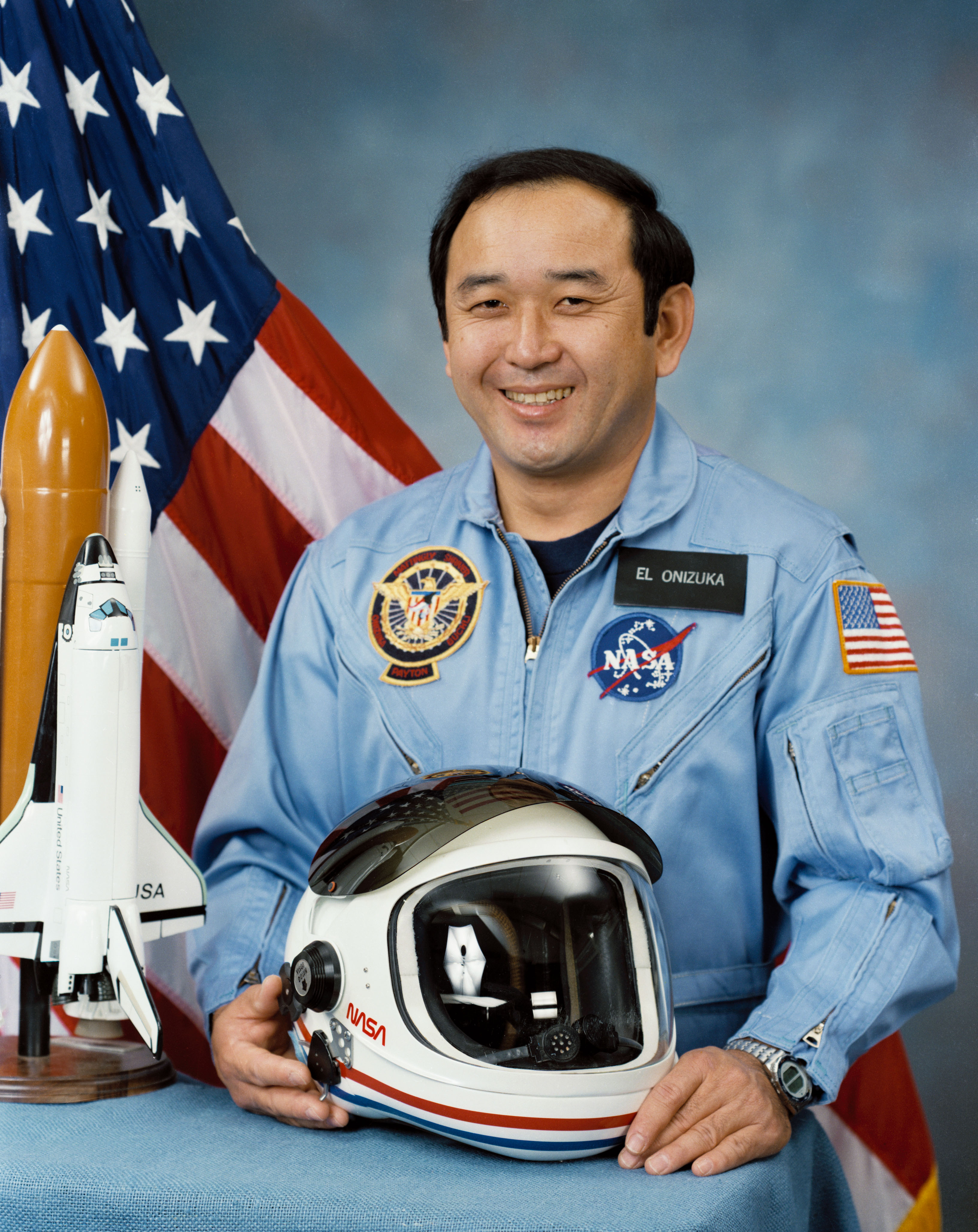
Ellison Onizuka, joint 158th person and the first Asian-American in space.

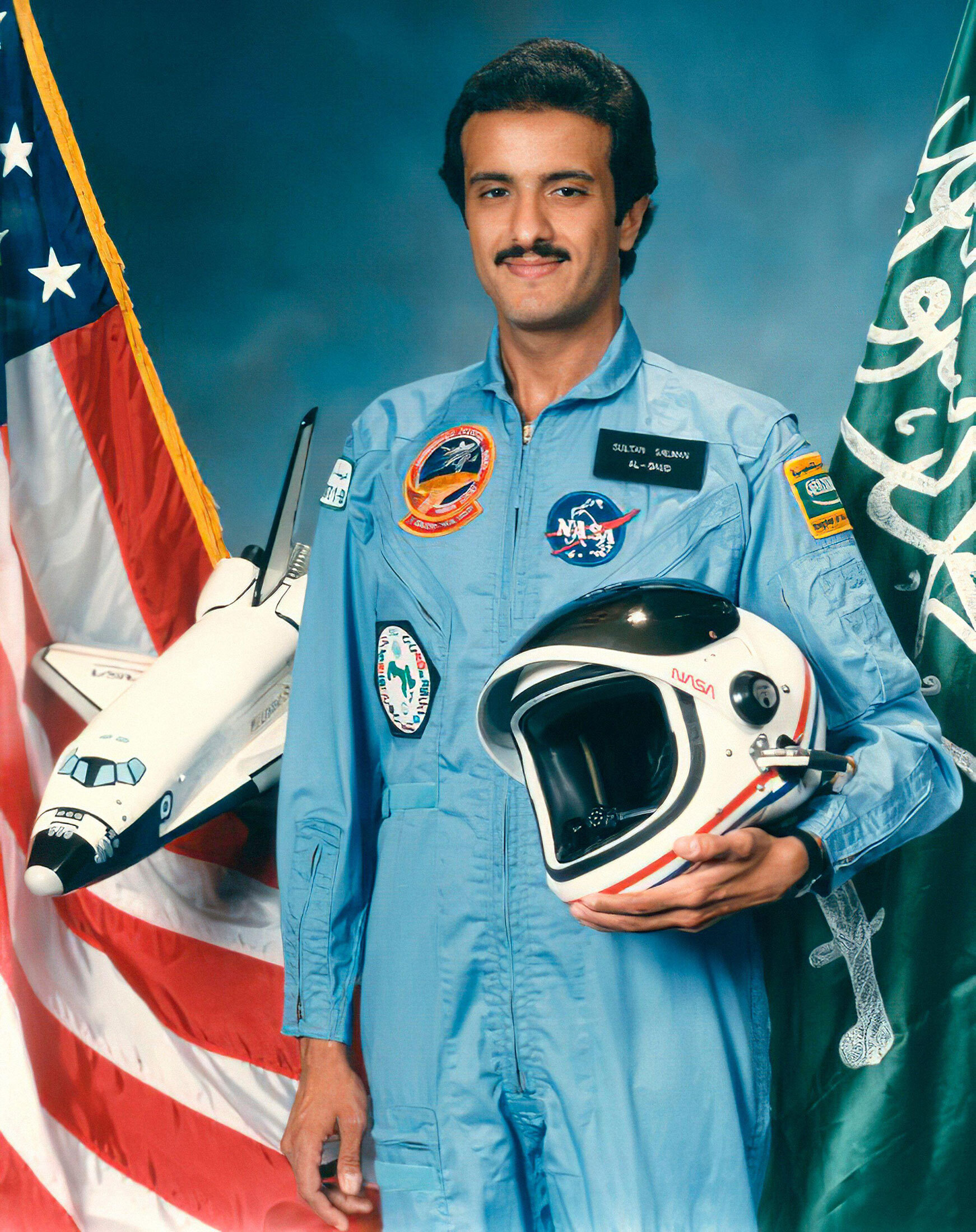
Sultan bin Salman Al Saud, joint 170th person, first royal, and first Saudi Arabian in space.

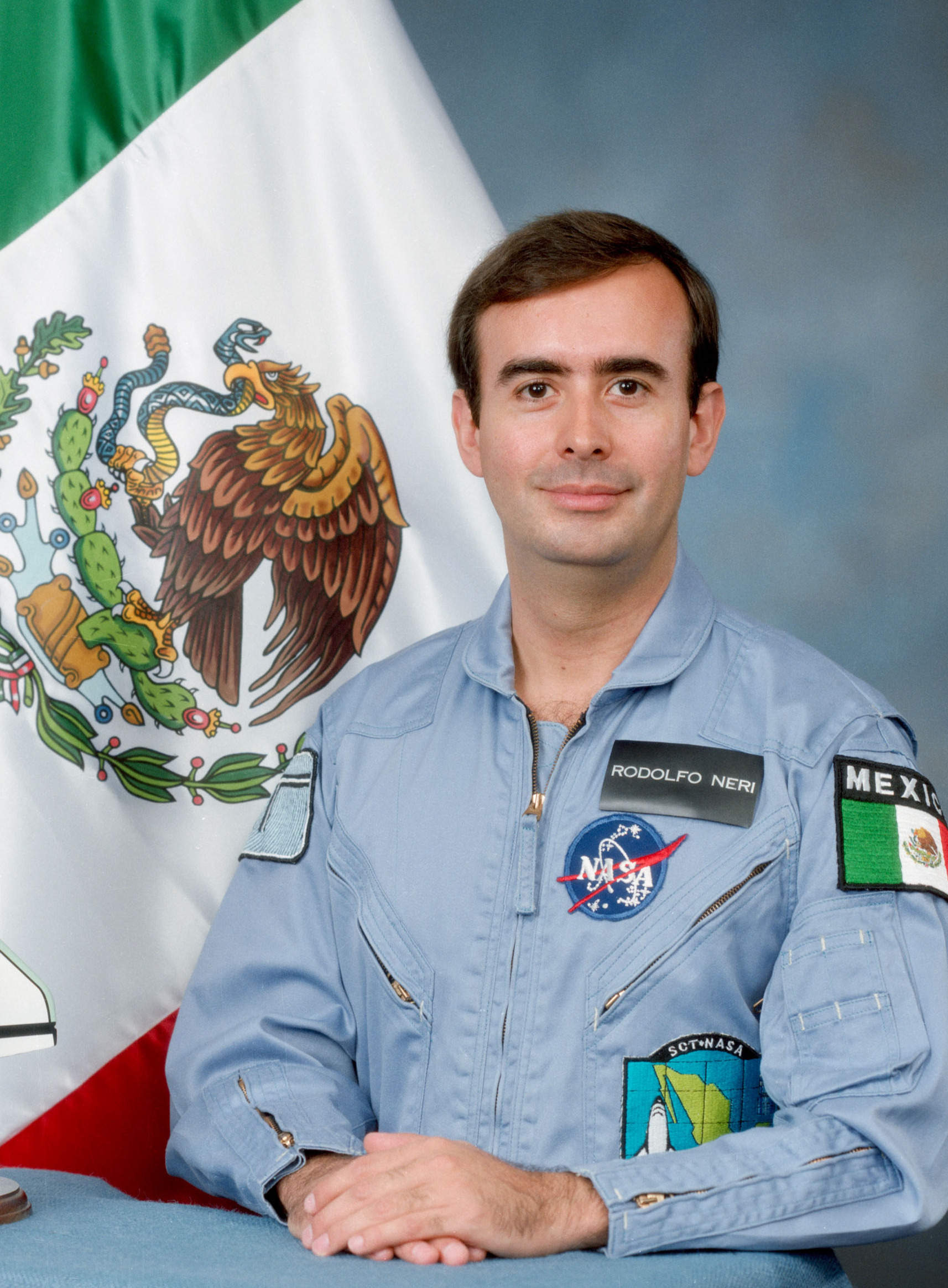
Rodolfo Neri Vela, joint 192nd and first Mexican in space

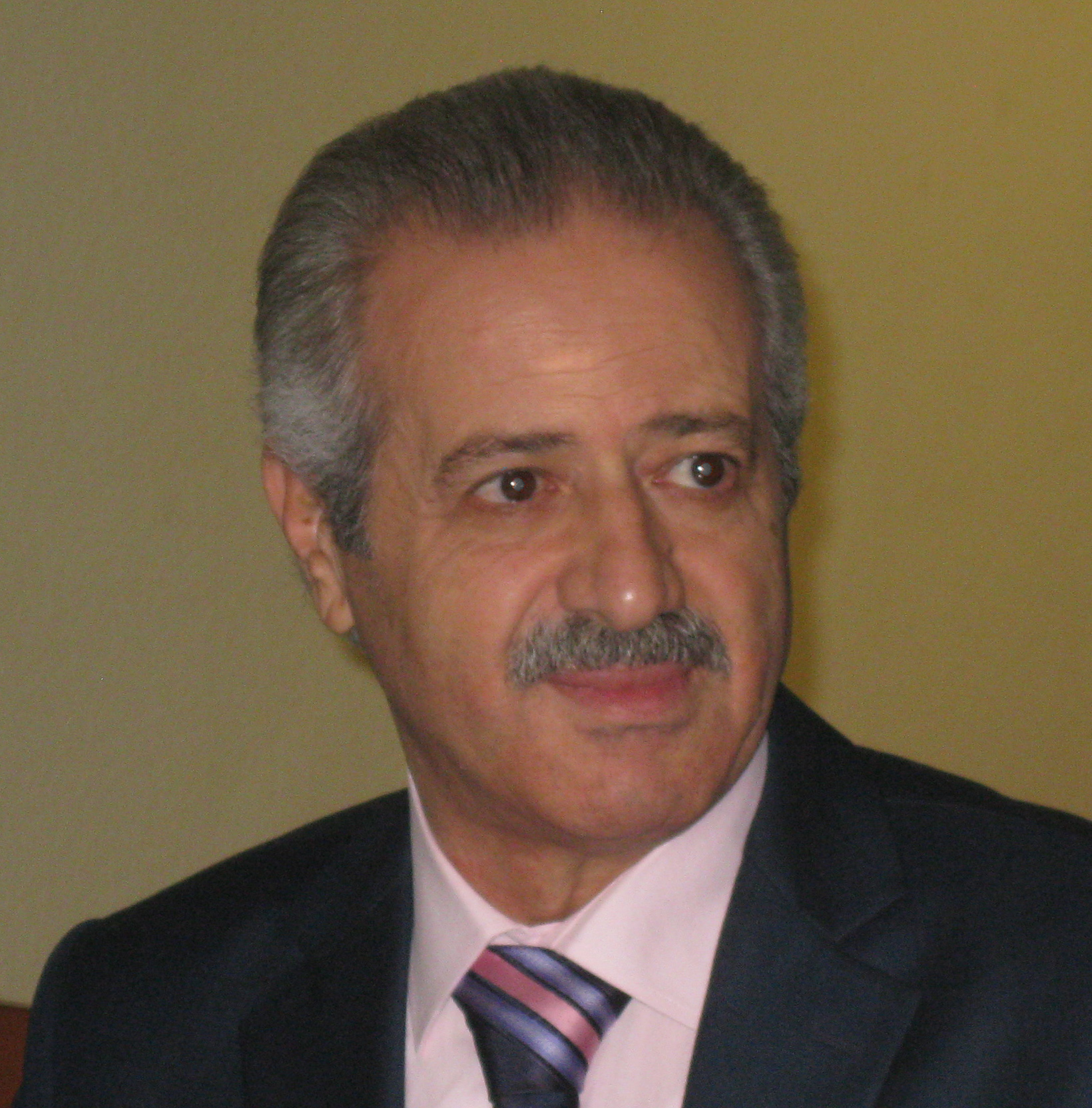
Muhammed Faris, joint 202nd and first Syrian in space

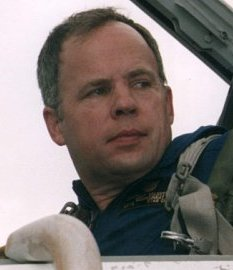
Anatoly Solovyev, joint 206th person in space and the person to have the most time in EVA, as of 2014

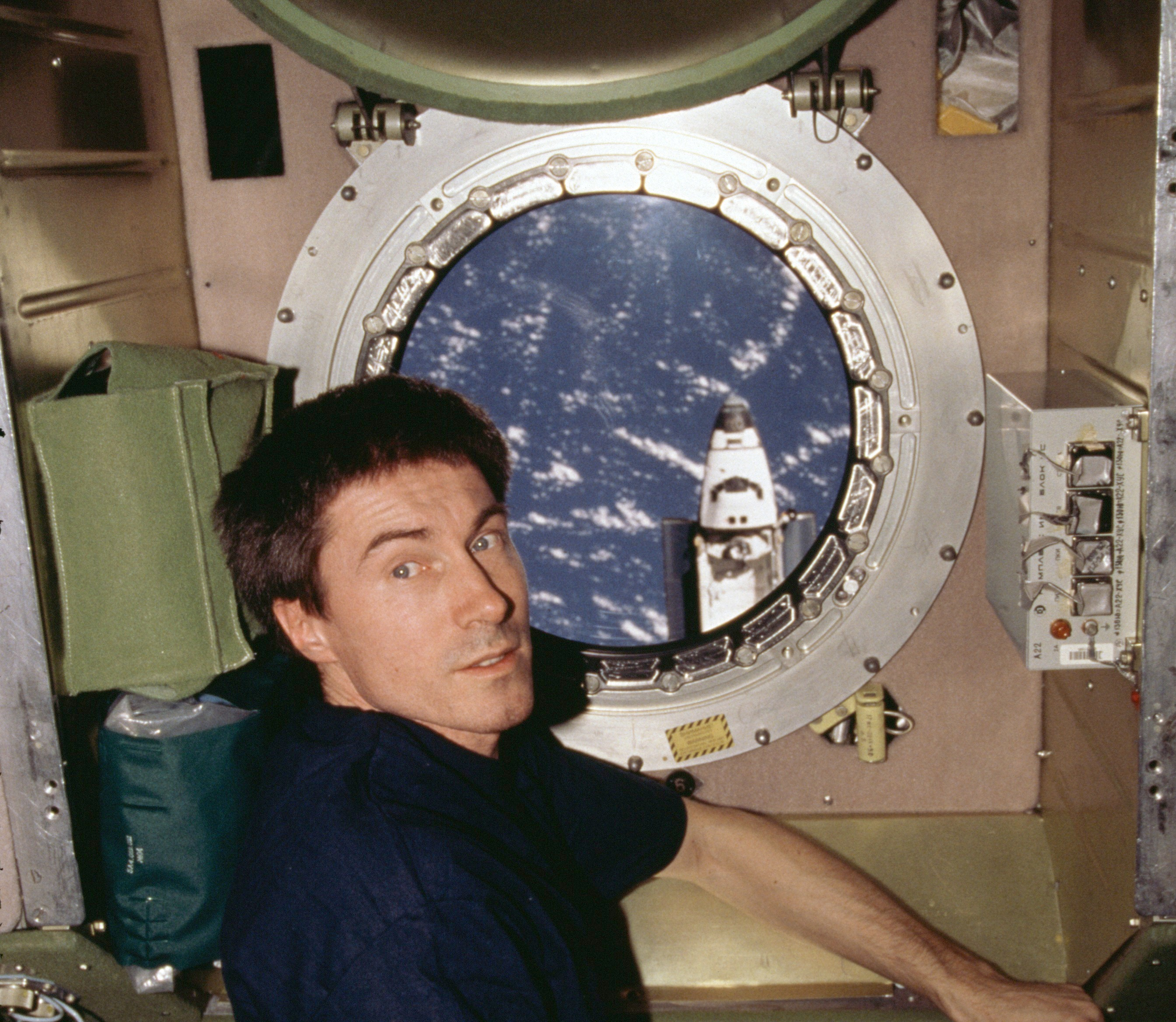
Sergei Krikalev, 210th person in space

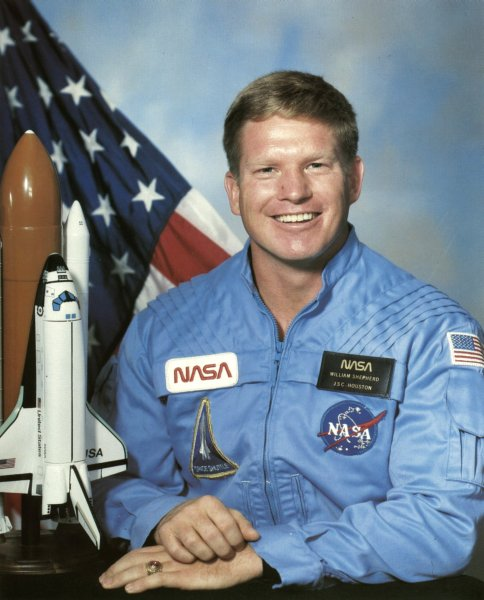
William Shepherd, joint 211th person in space and the first commander of the ISS

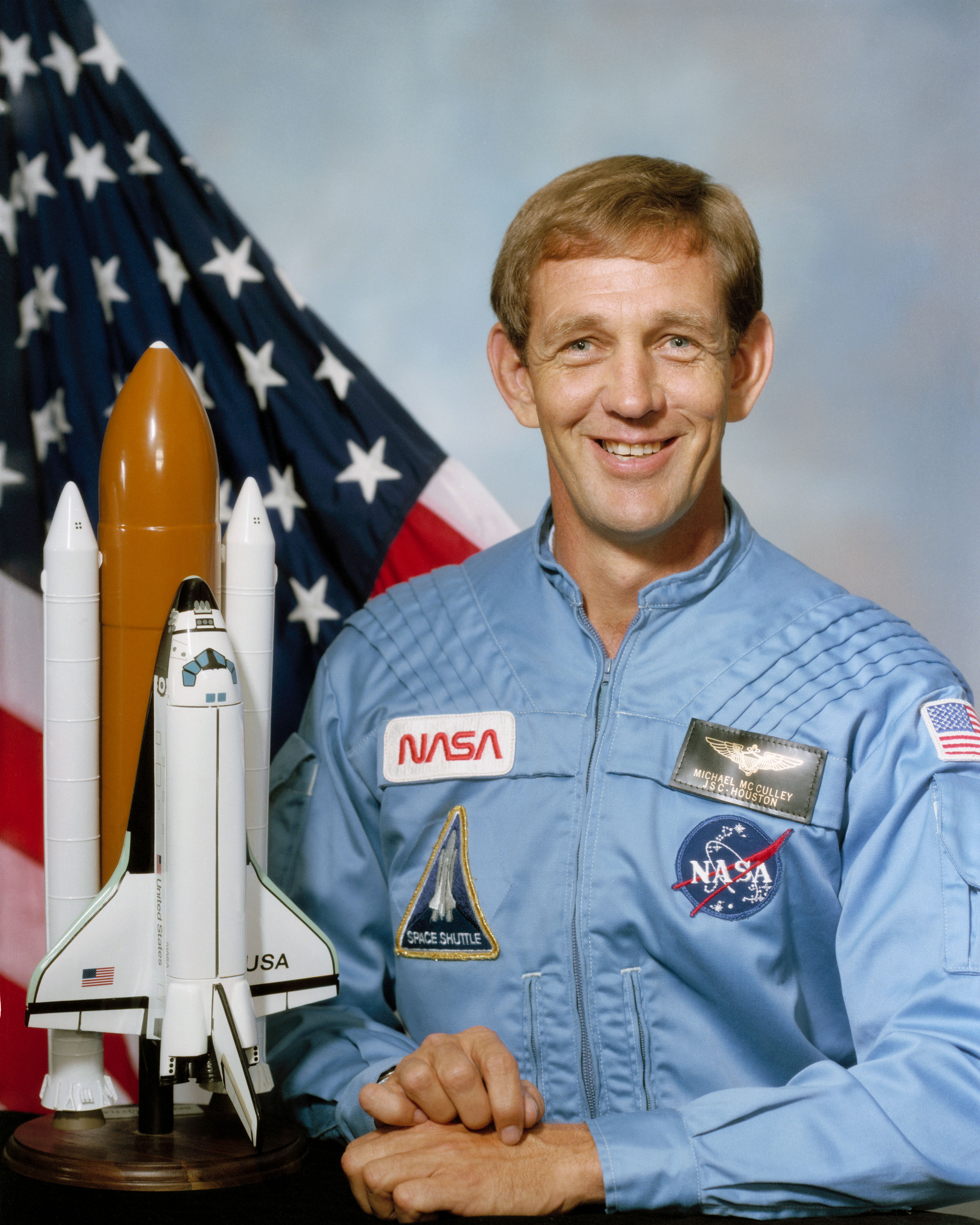
Michael McCulley, joint 221st person in space and first submariner to go into space

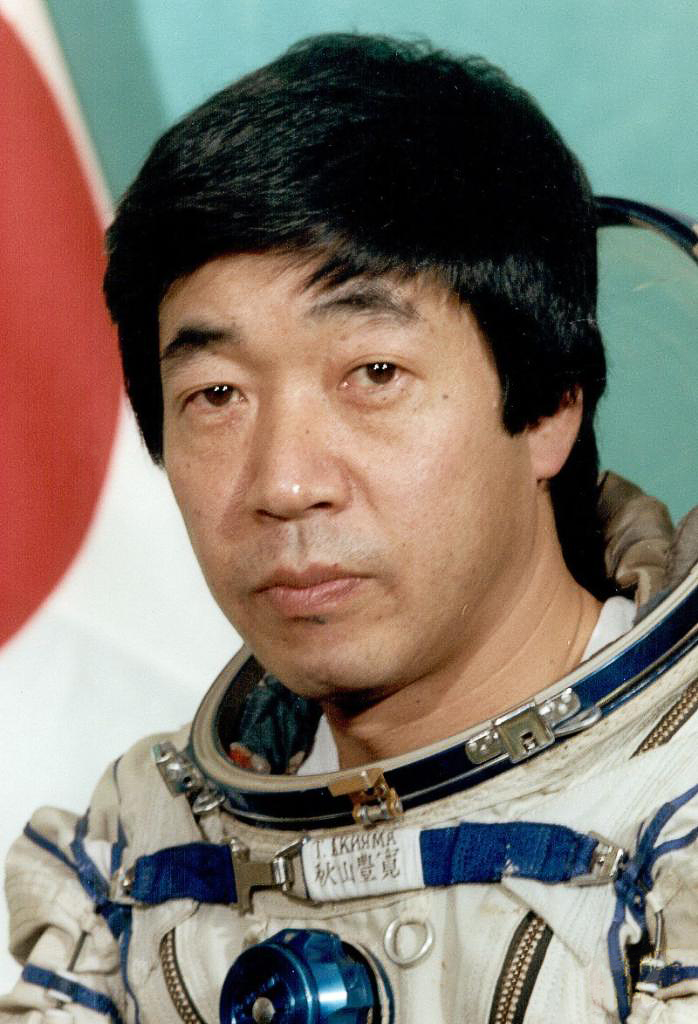
Toyohiro Akiyama, joint 239th person and the first journalist and the first Japanese in space on the first commercially organized spaceflight.

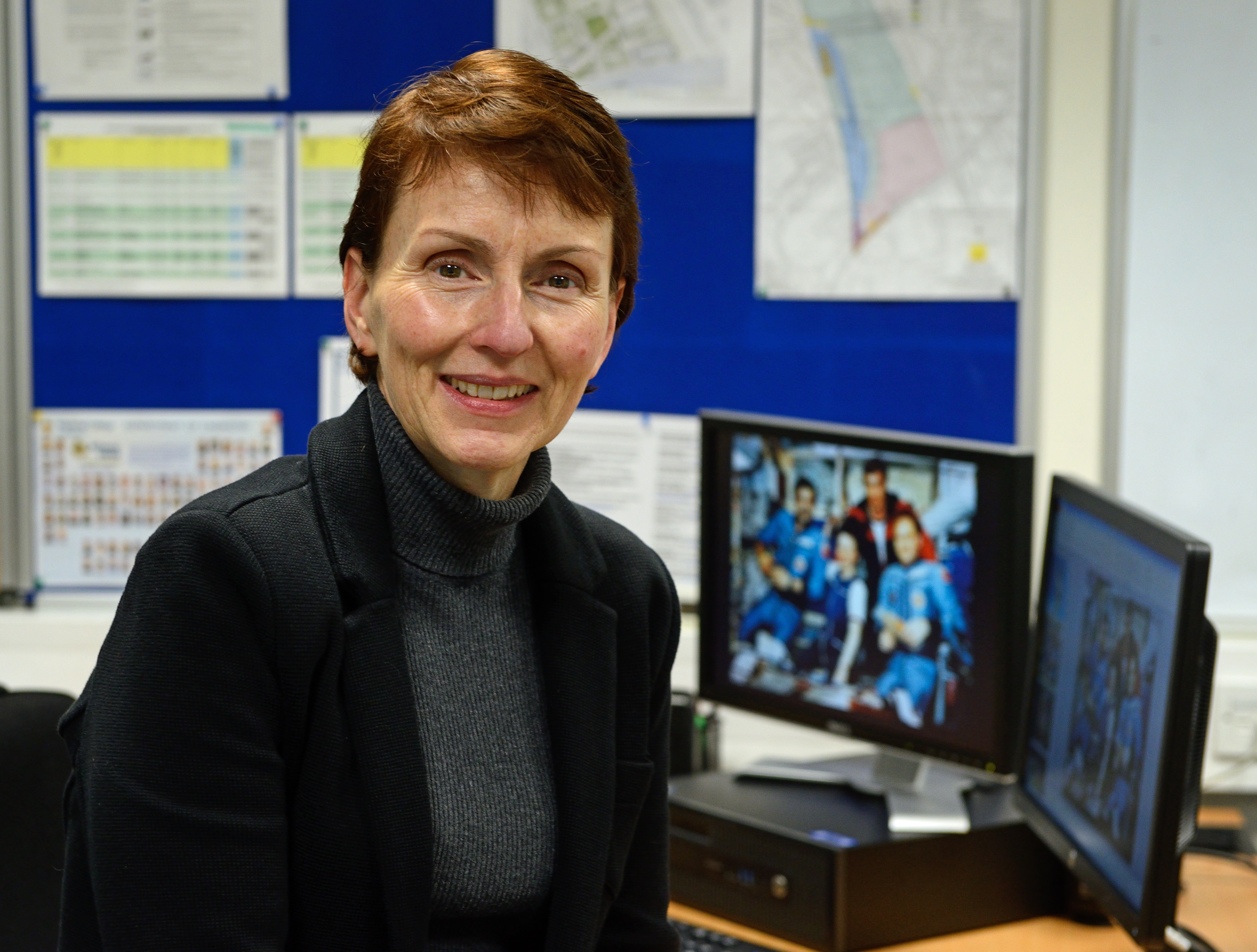
Helen Sharman, joint 249th and first British astronaut

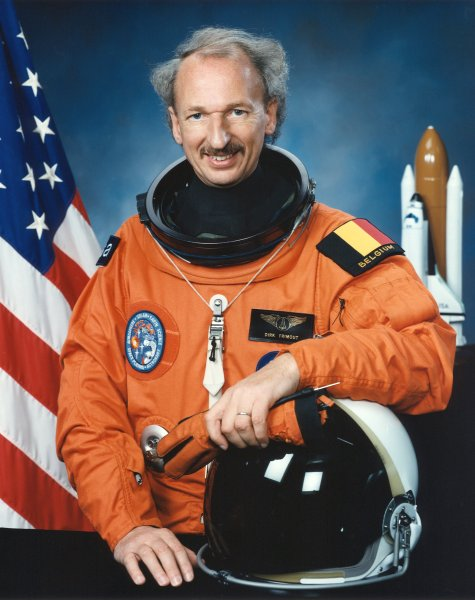
Dirk Frimout, joint 268th and first Belgian to go into space

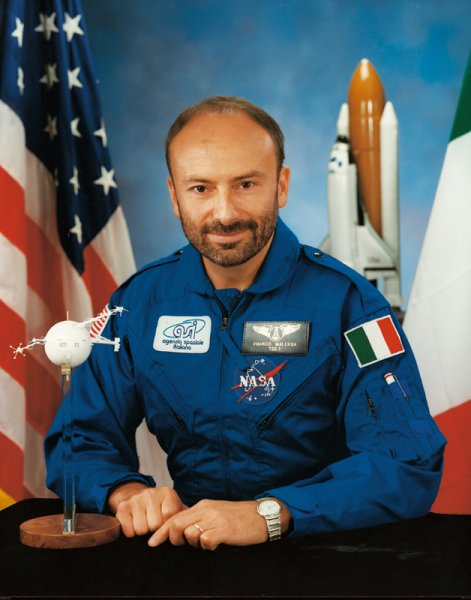
Franco Malerba, joint 277th and first Italian to go into space

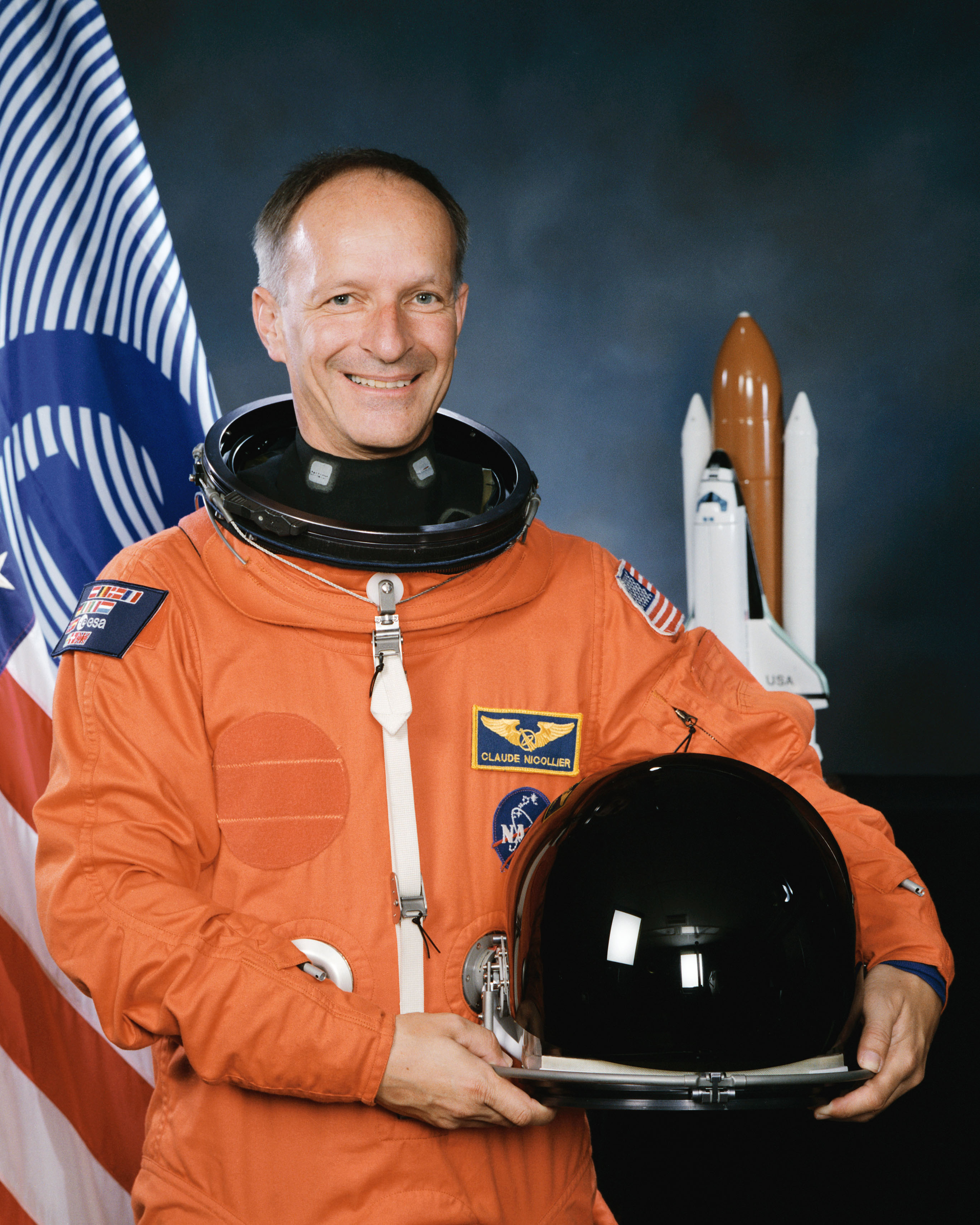
Claude Nicollier, joint 277th and first Swiss to go into space

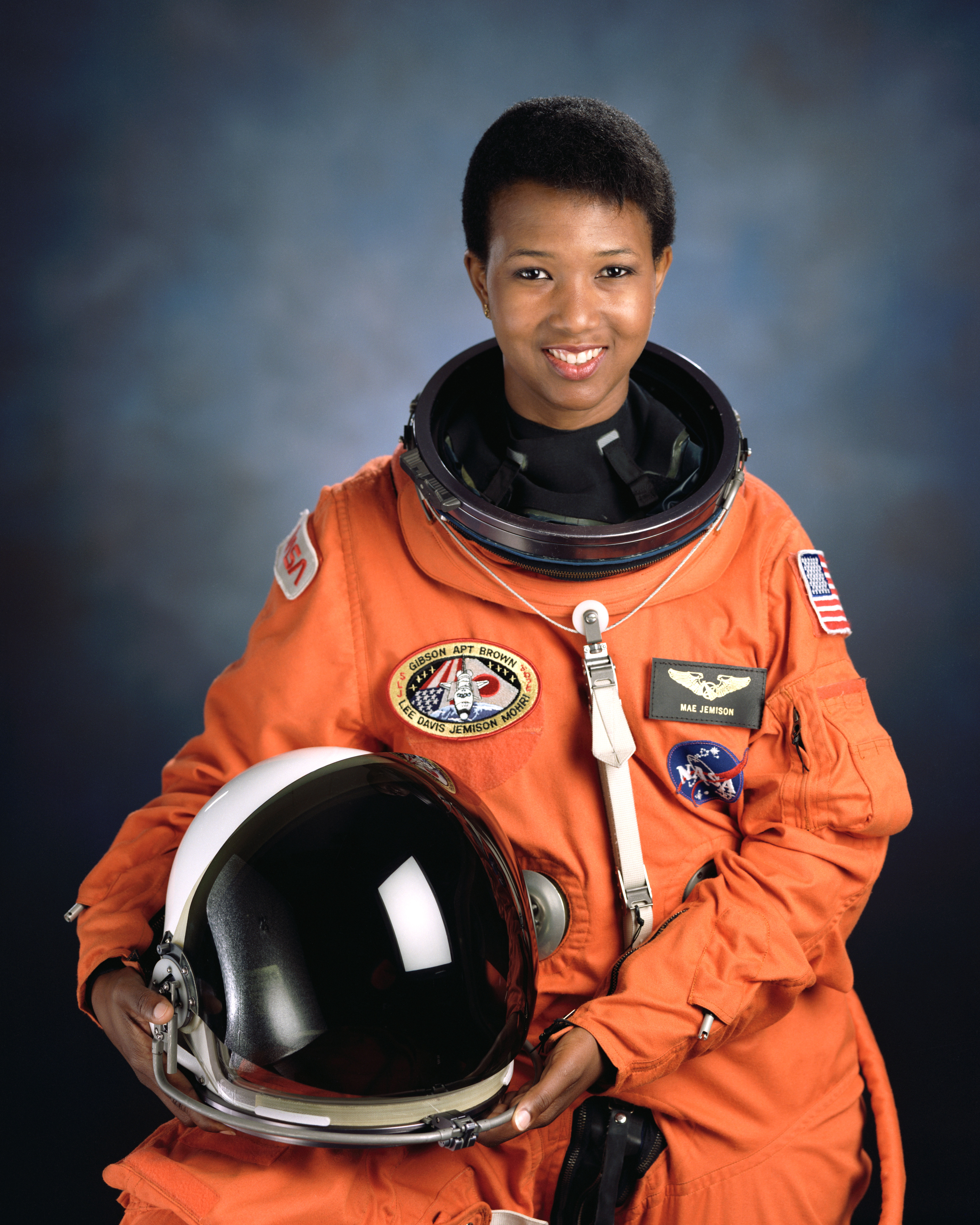
Mae Jemison, joint 280th person and first African American woman to go into space

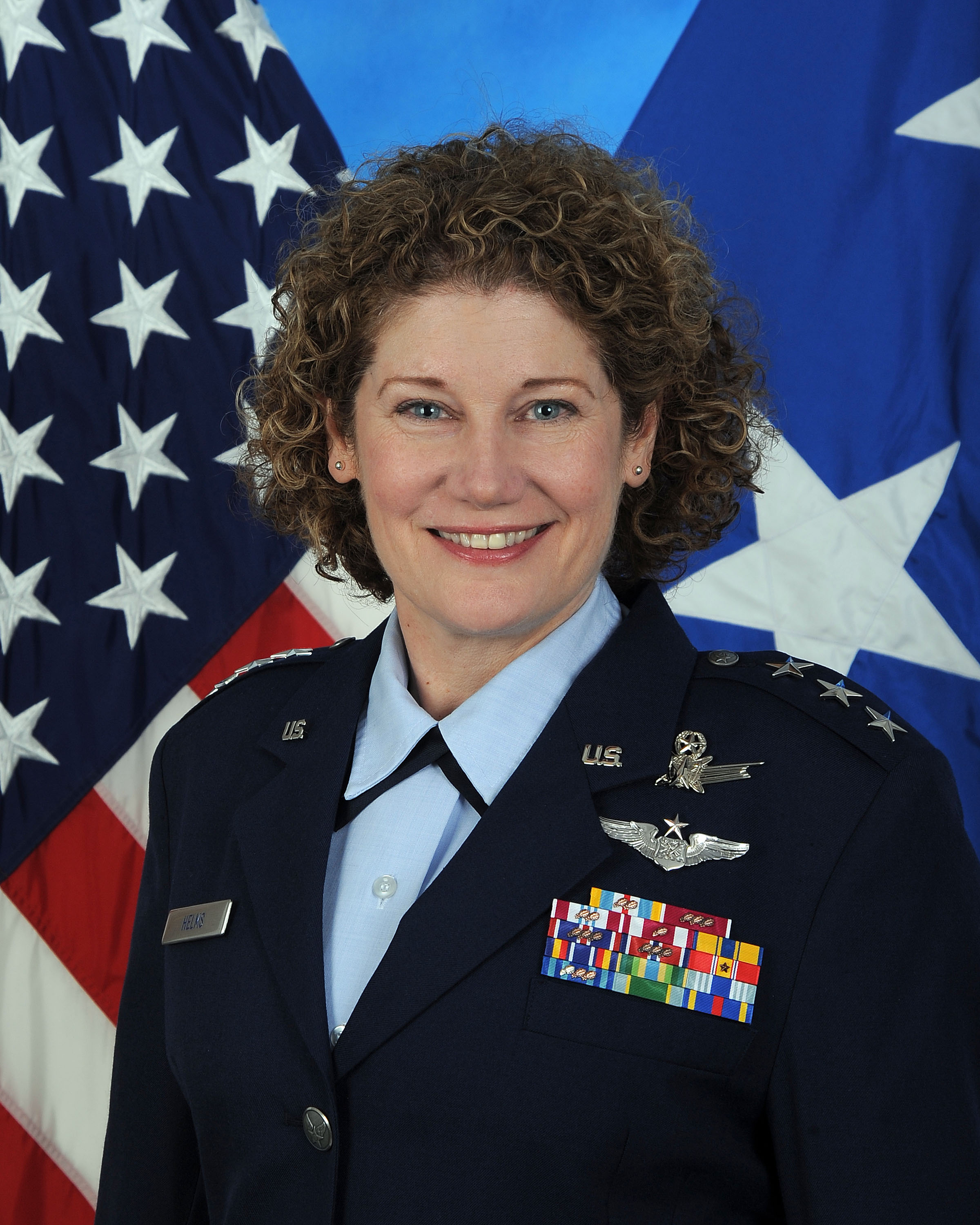
Susan Helms, joint 286th person in space and first woman to serve on board the ISS

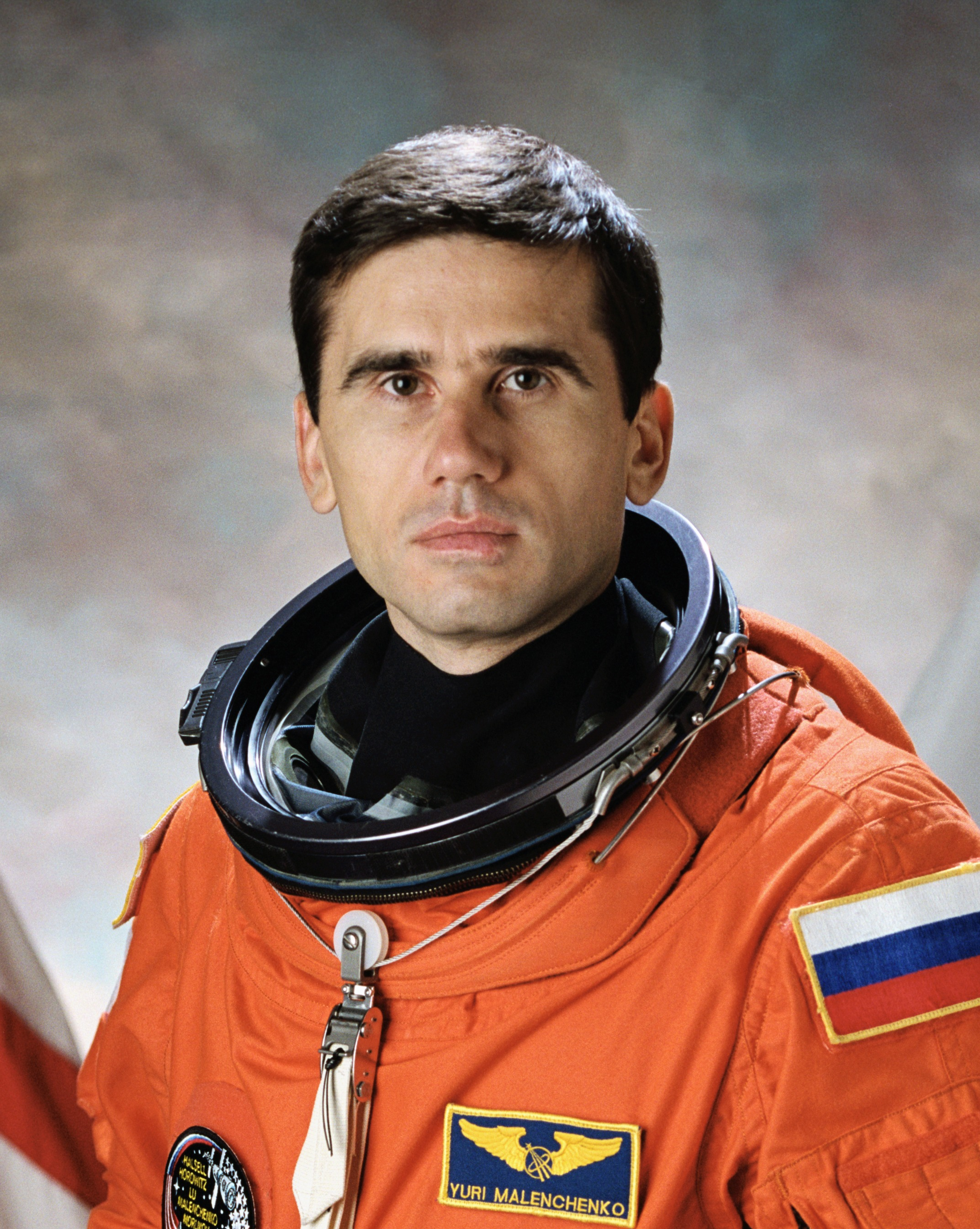
Yuri Malenchenko, joint 309th person in space and first to marry in space

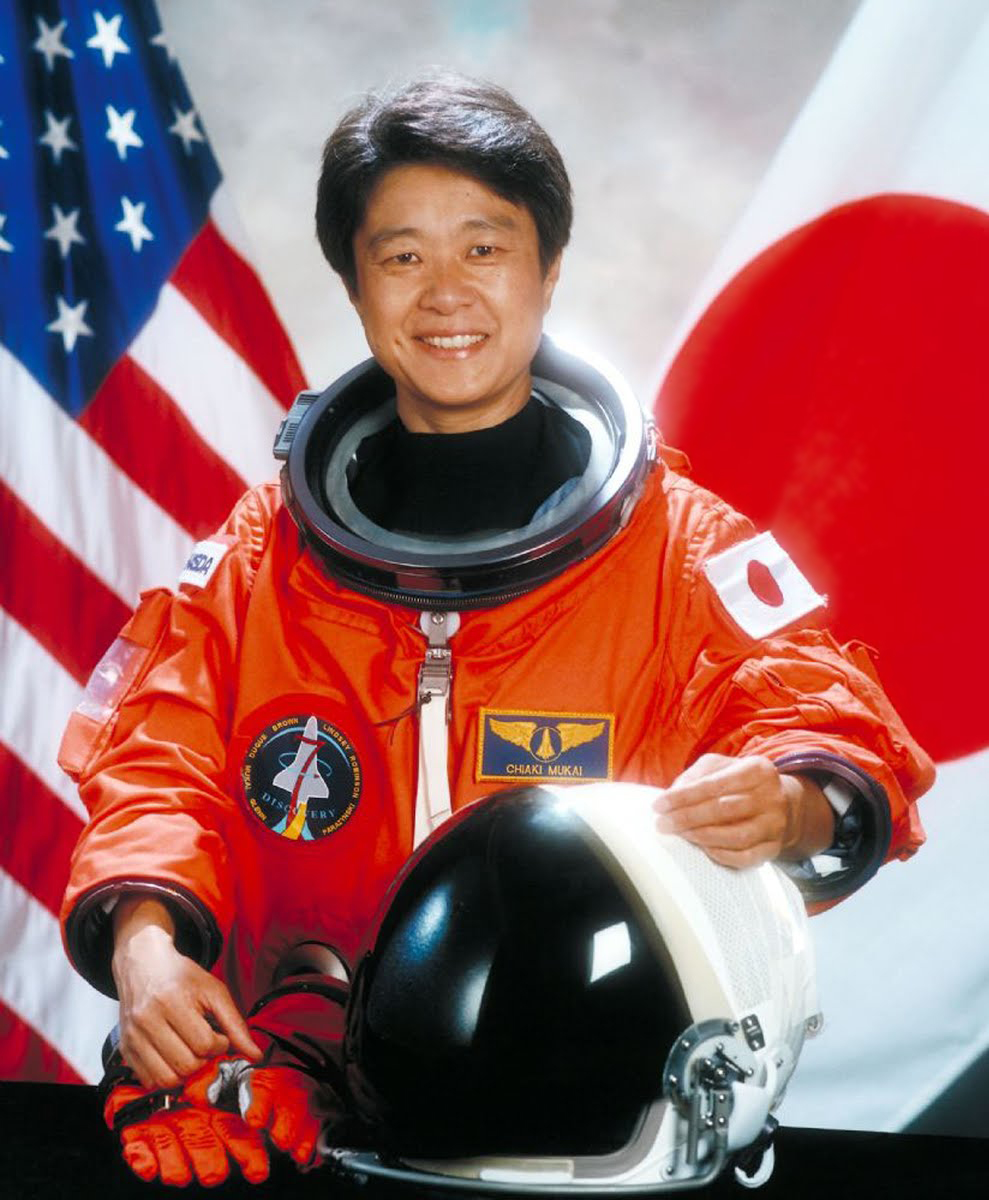
Chiaki Mukai, joint 311th person and first Japanese woman in space

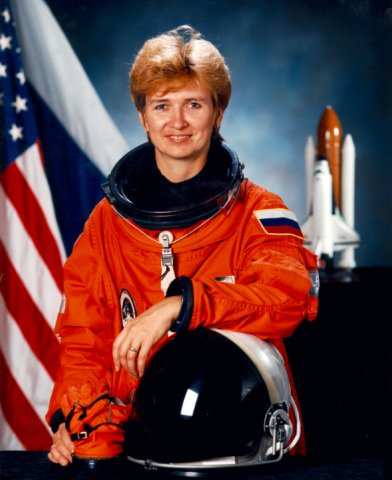
Yelena Kondakova, 318th person in space and first woman to make a long-duration spaceflight

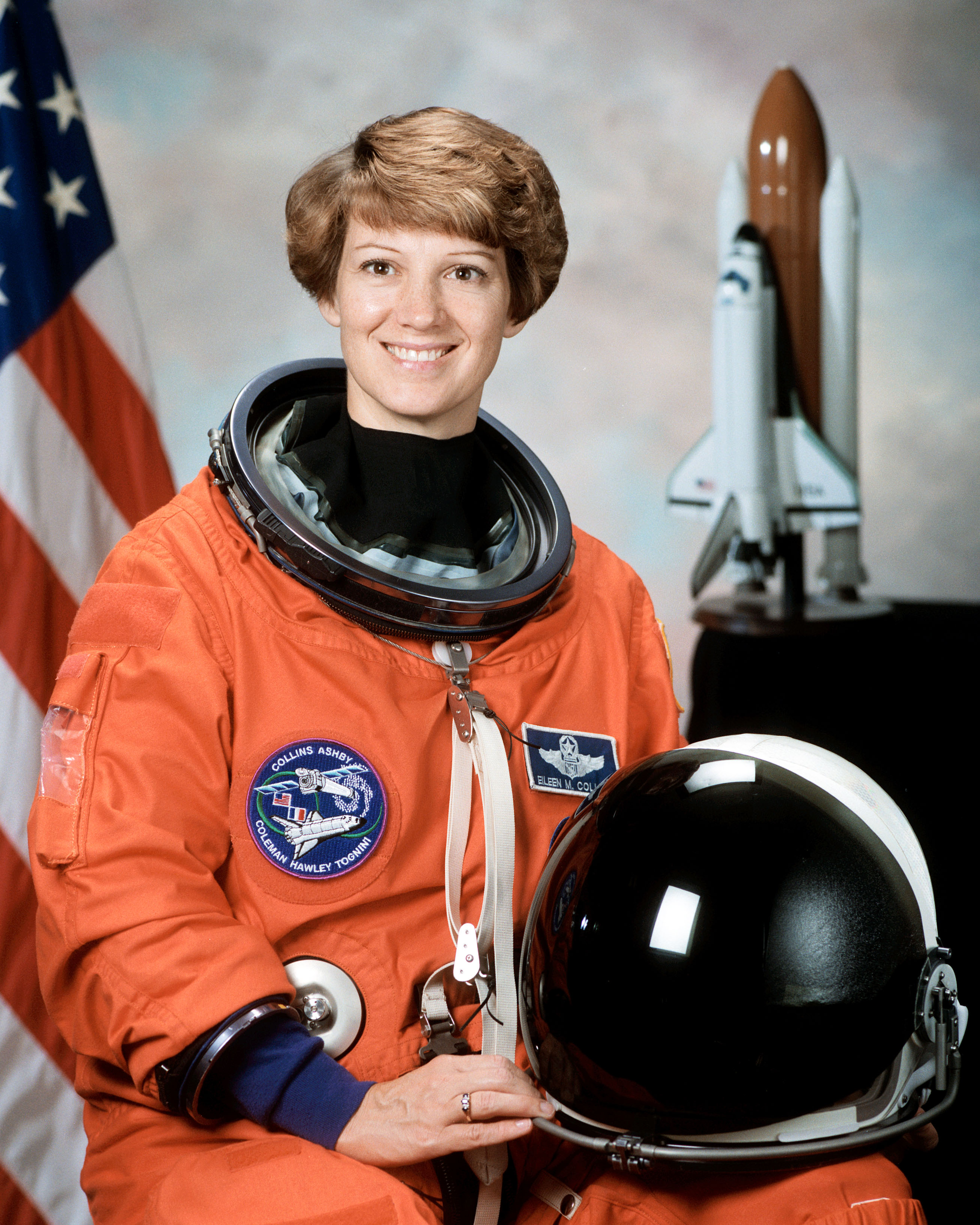
Eileen Collins, the 322nd person in space, first female commander and first female pilot of a Space Shuttle

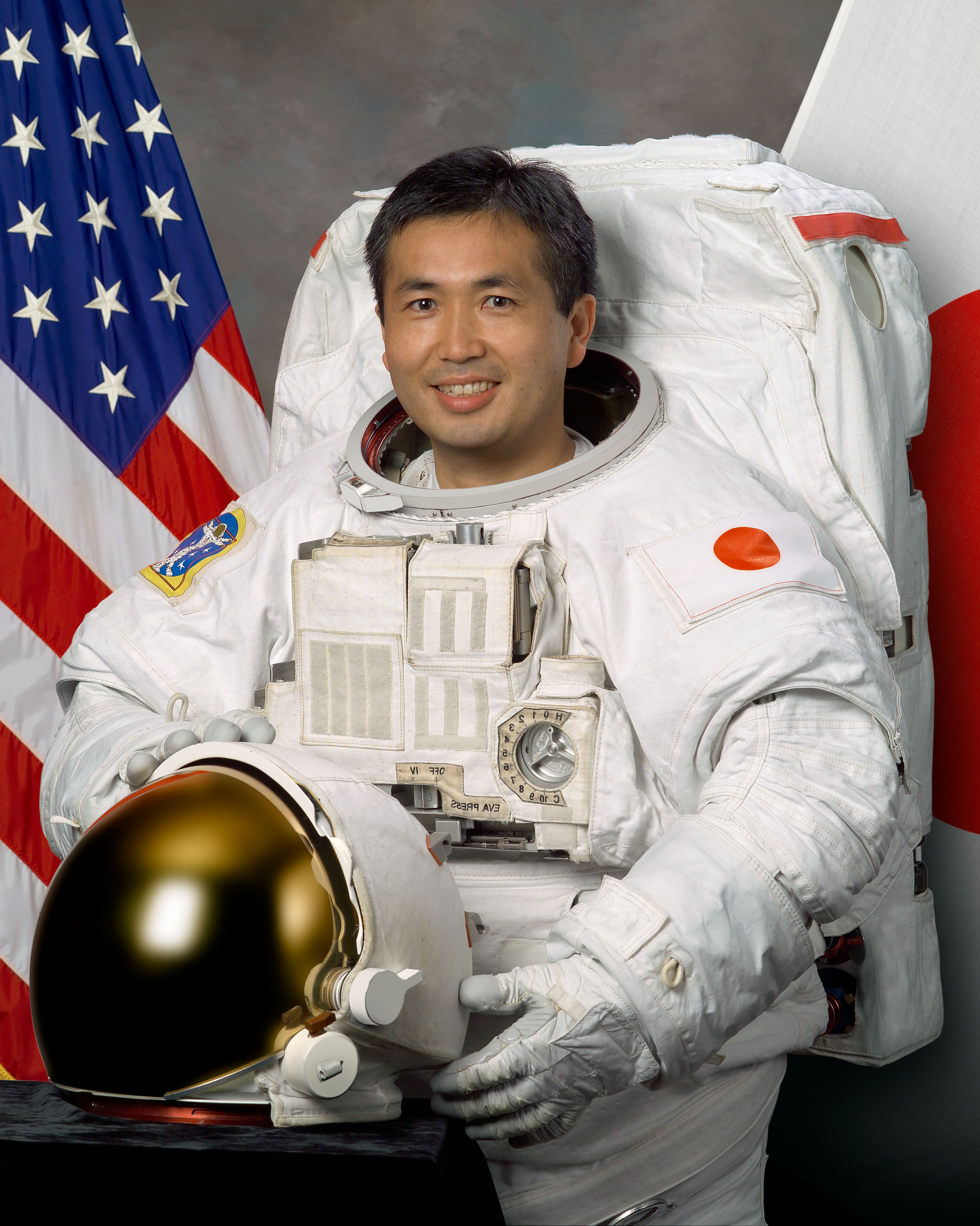
Koichi Wakata, joint 339th person in space and first Japanese commander of the ISS

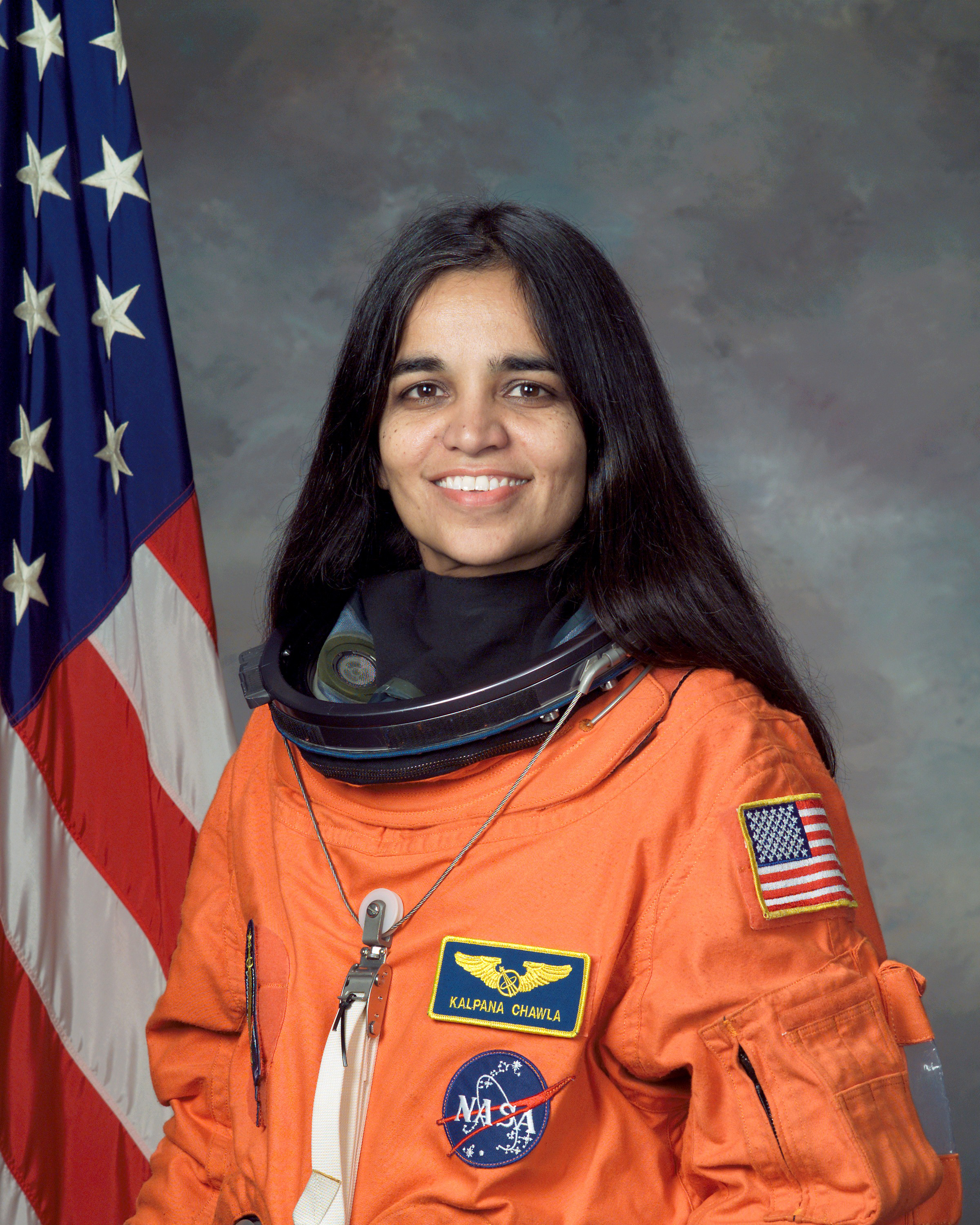
Kalpana Chawla, joint 366th person, first Indian American astronaut and first Indian woman in space

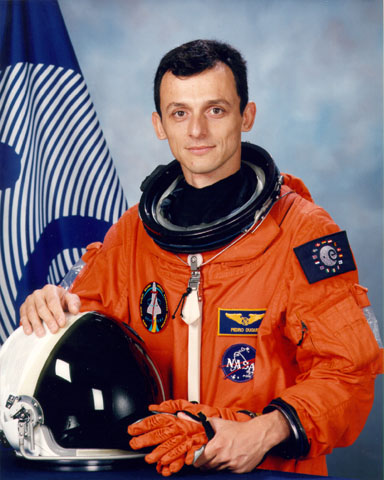
Pedro Duque, 384th person in space and first Spanish national

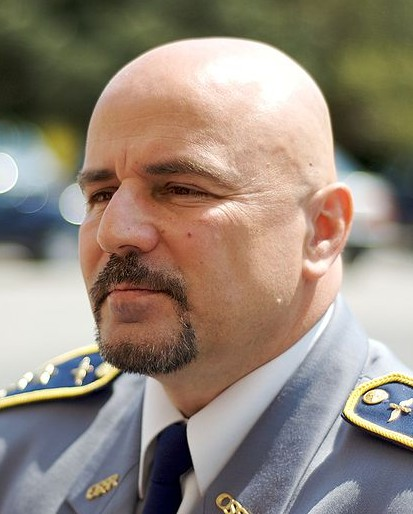
Ivan Bella, 386th person and first Slovak in space

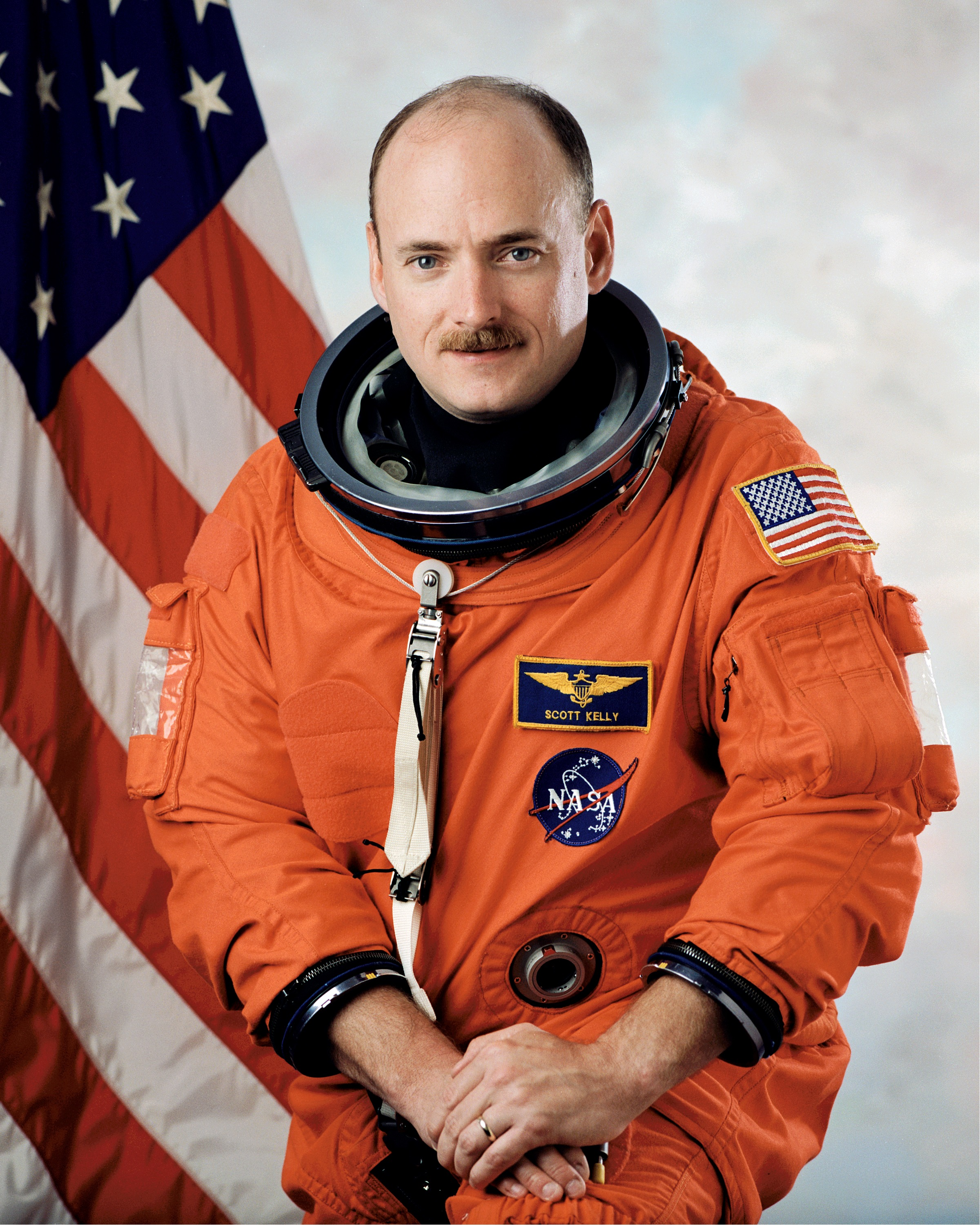
Scott Kelly, 391st person and first of the first identical twin brothers to go into space

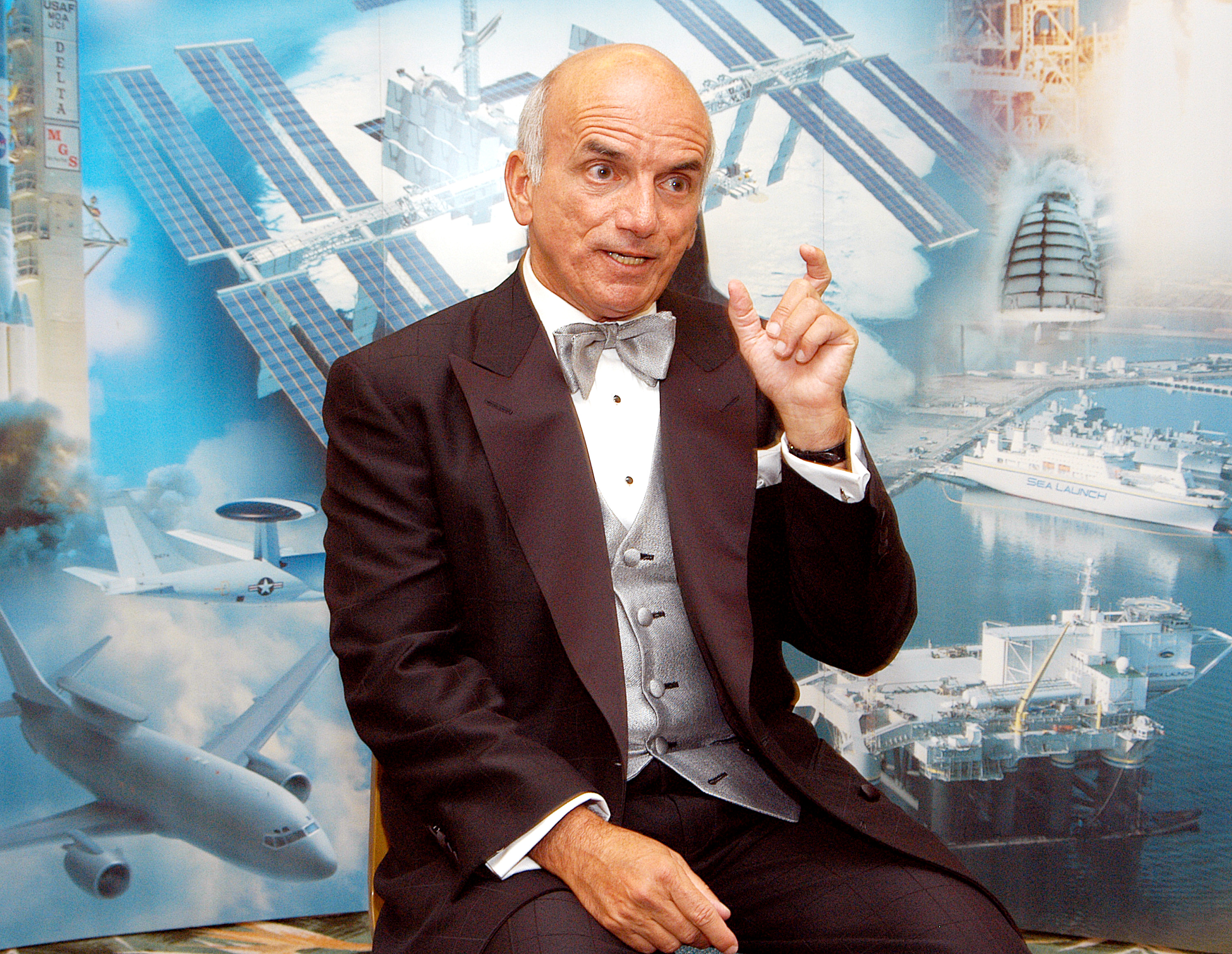
Dennis Tito, the 404th person in space and the first space tourist

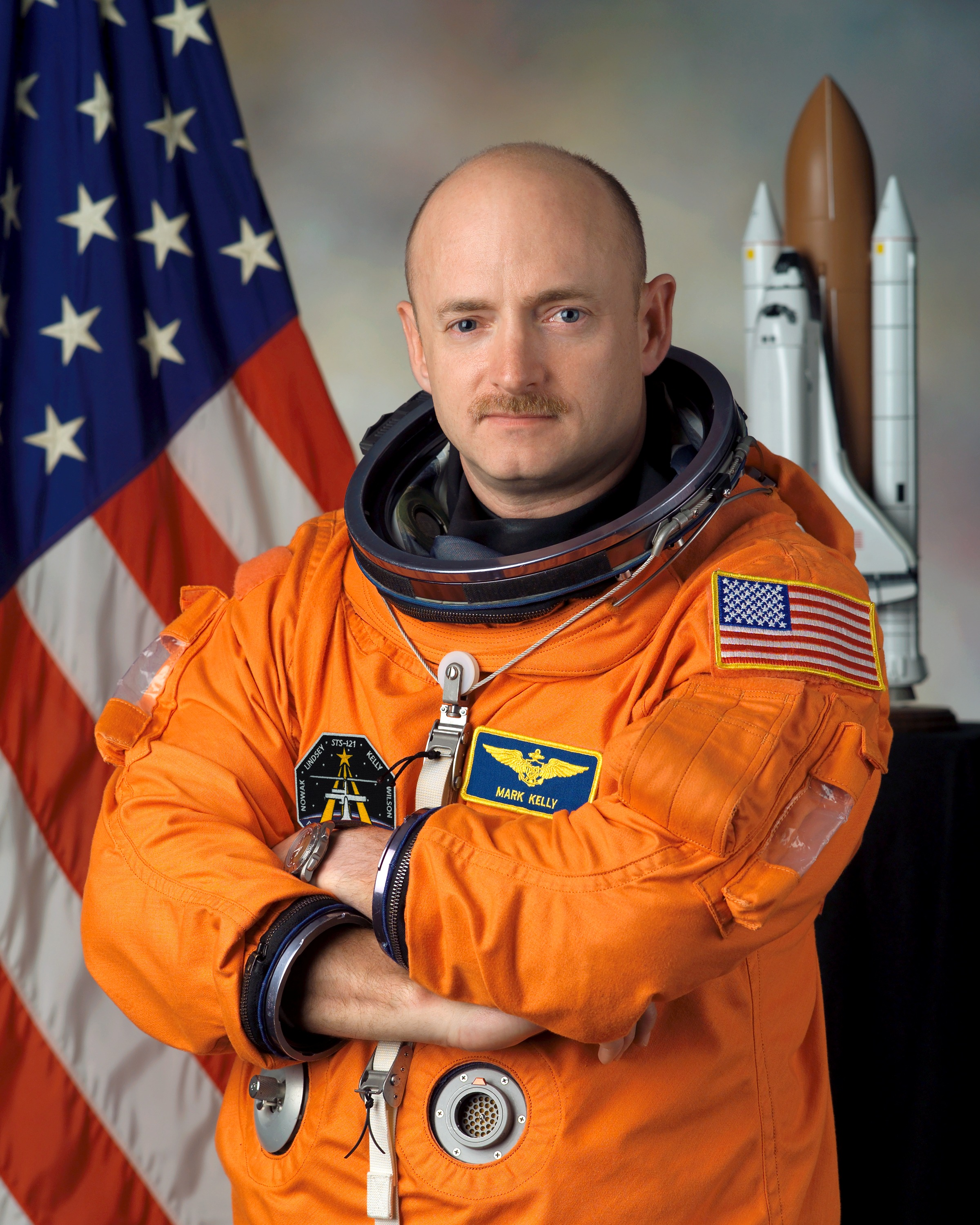
Mark Kelly, the 409th person in space, and the second of the first identical twin brothers to go into space

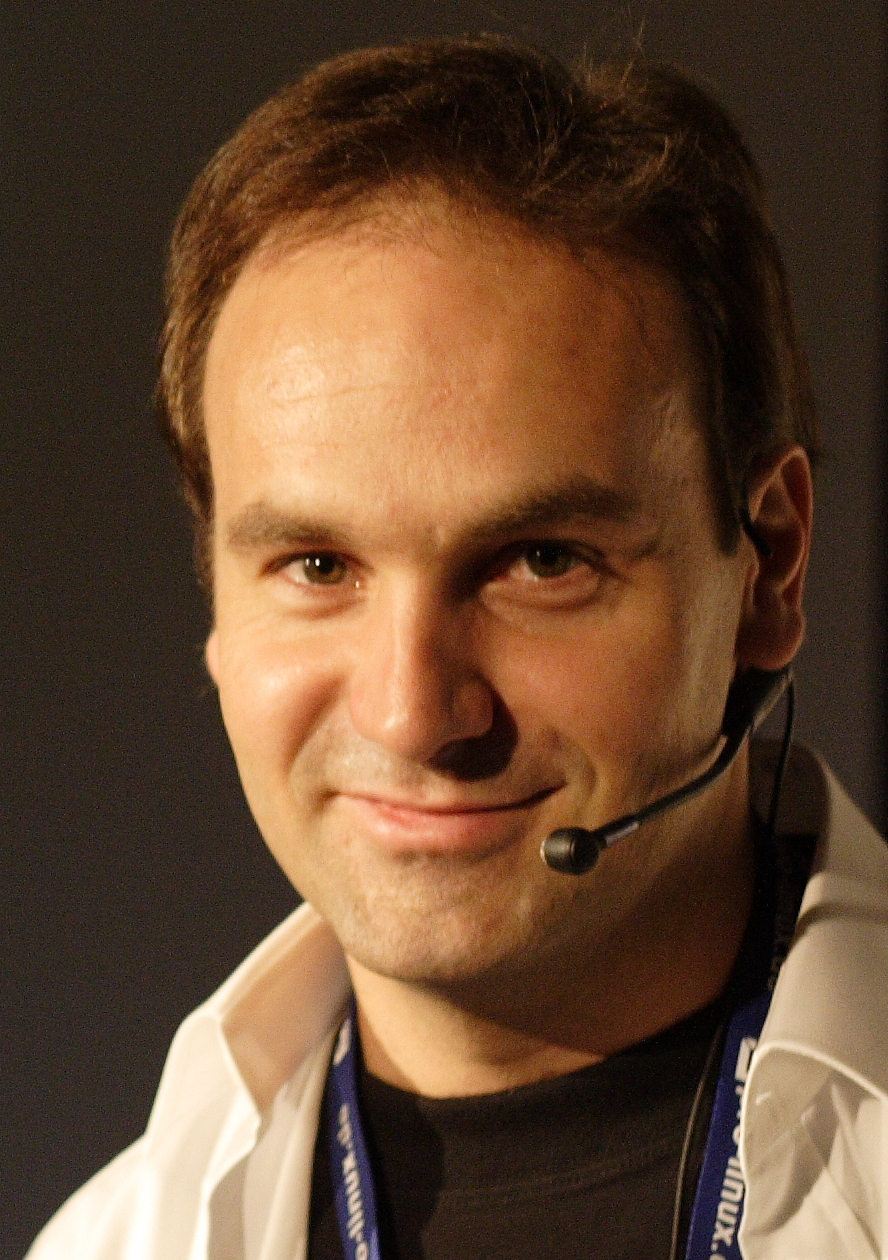
Mark Shuttleworth, 416th person in space and the first from an independent African country (South Africa)

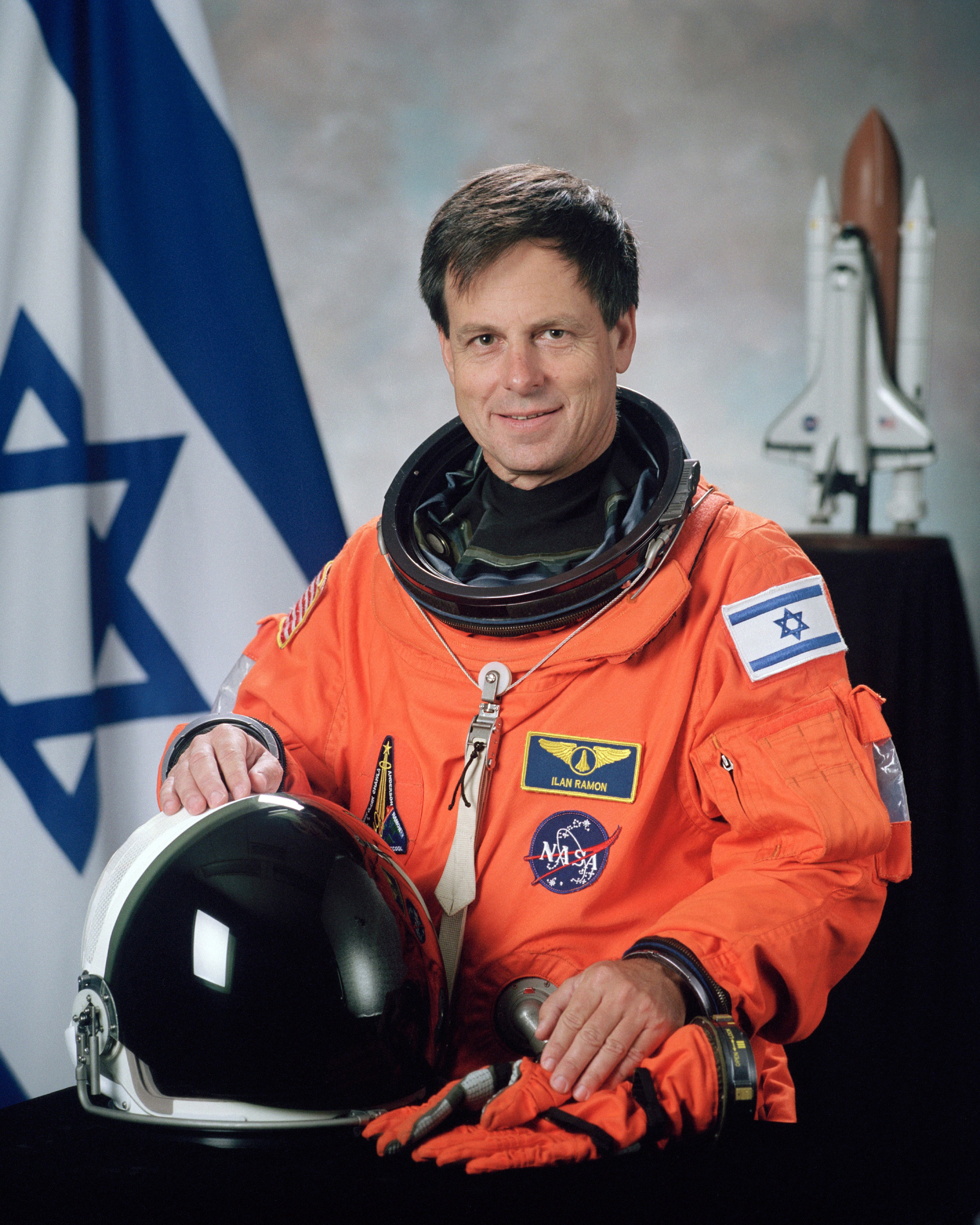
Ilan Ramon, joint 431st person and first Israeli in space

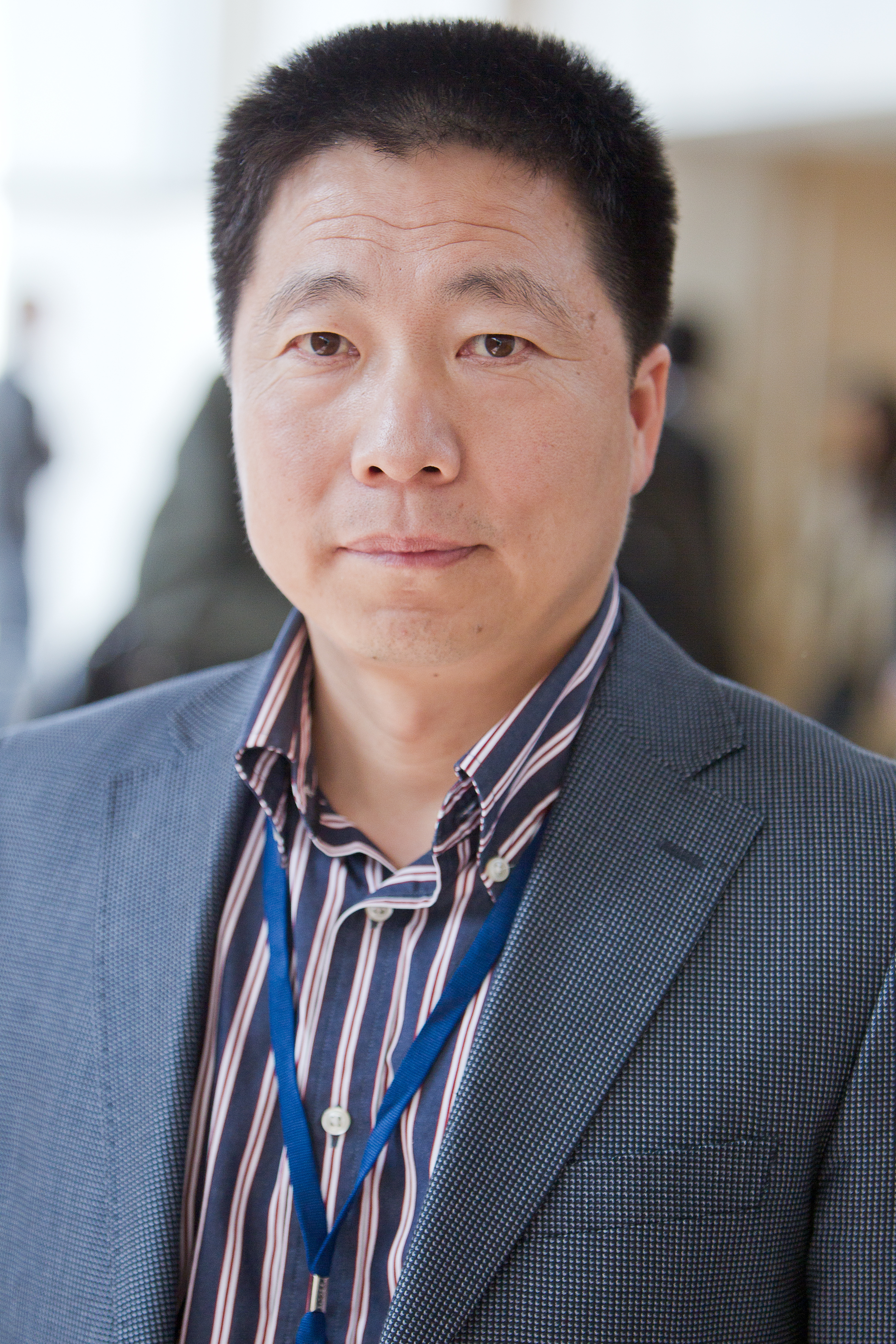
Yang Liwei, the 432nd person in space and the first of the Chinese space program

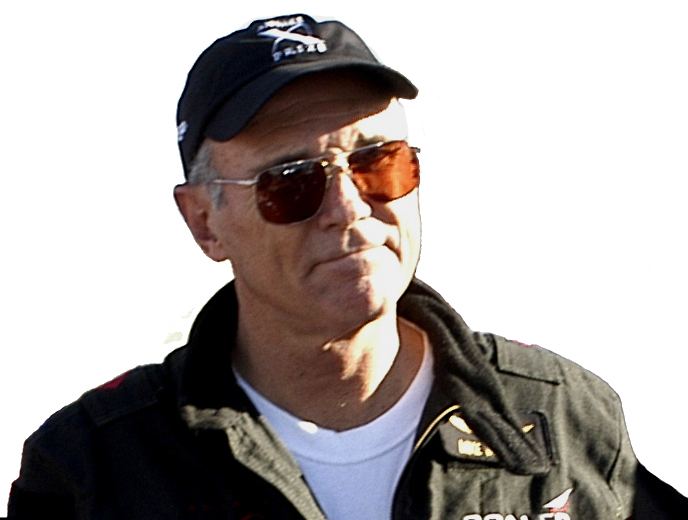
Mike Melvill, the 435th person in space and the first commercial astronaut of a privately flown and funded spaceflight

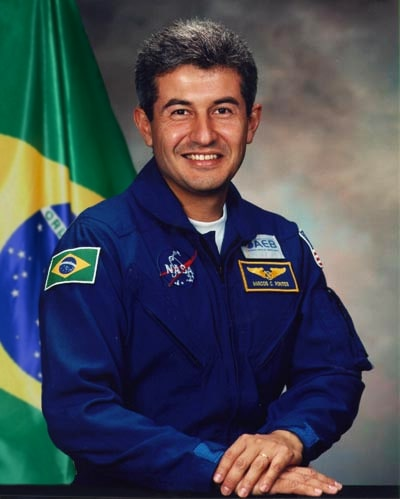
Marcos Pontes, the 443rd person and the first Brazilian in space

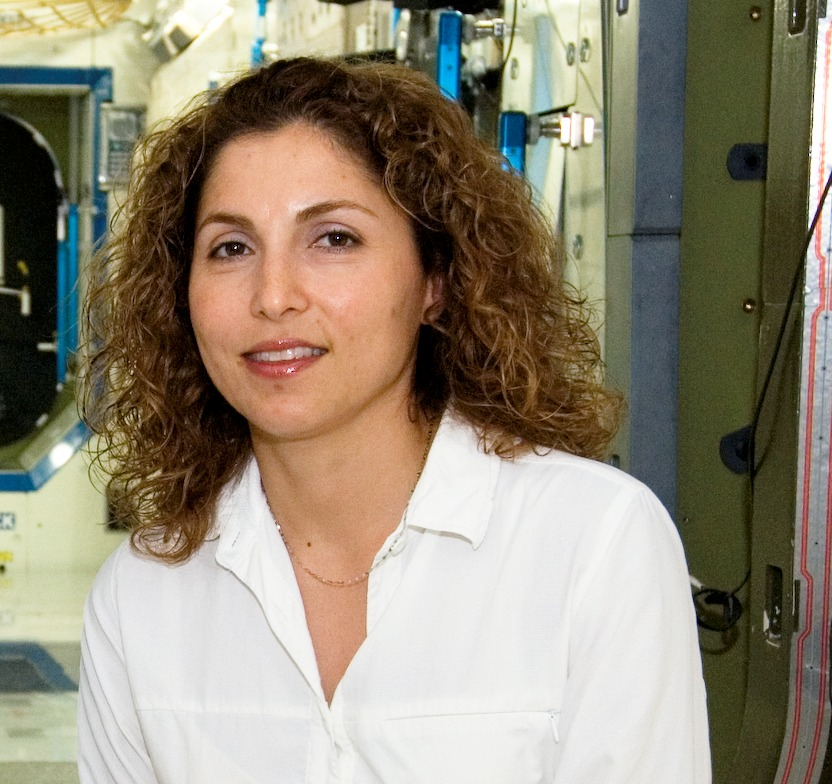
Anousheh Ansari, the 449th person in space, first female space tourist and the first Iranian in space

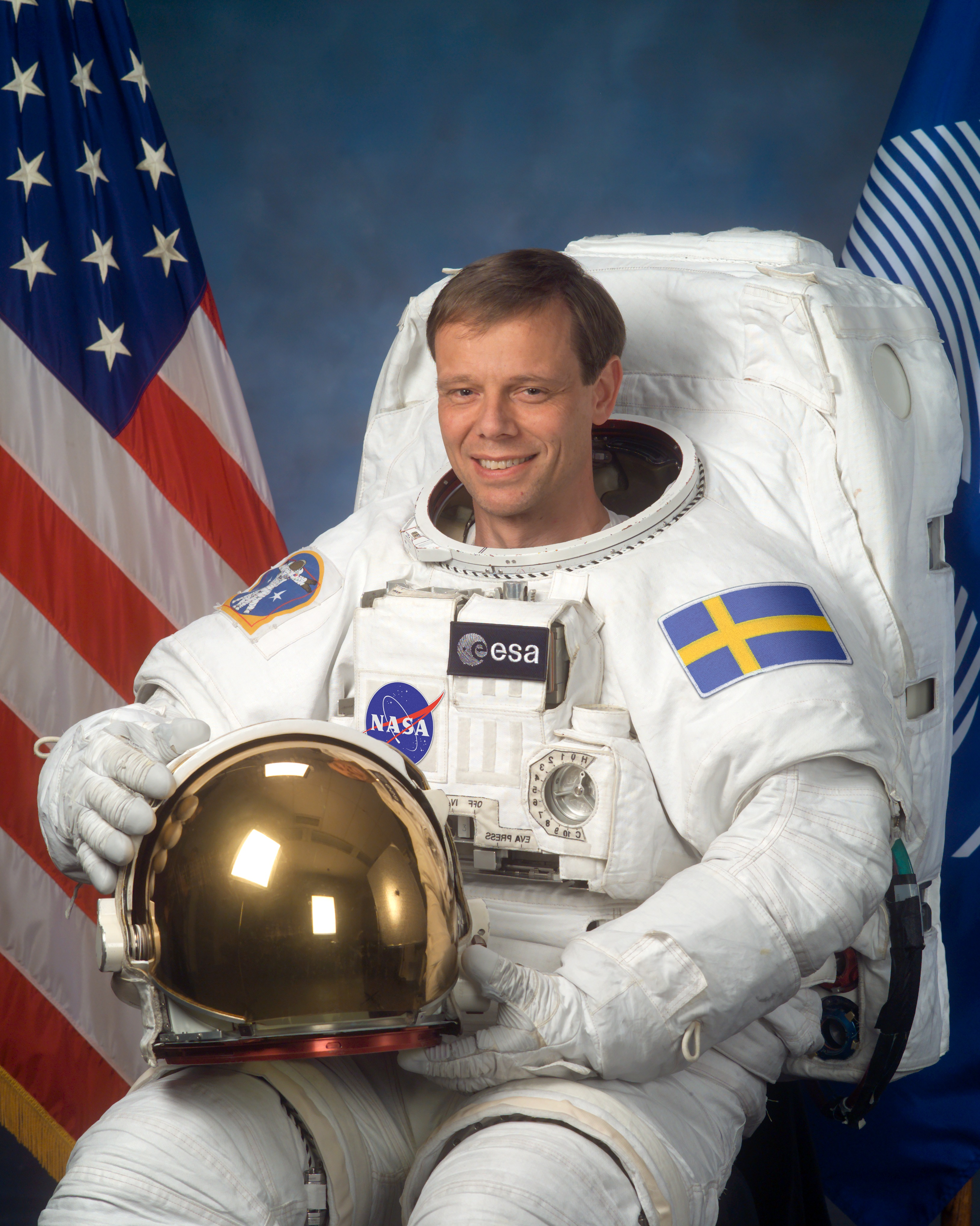
Christer Fuglesang, joint 450th person and first Swedish in space

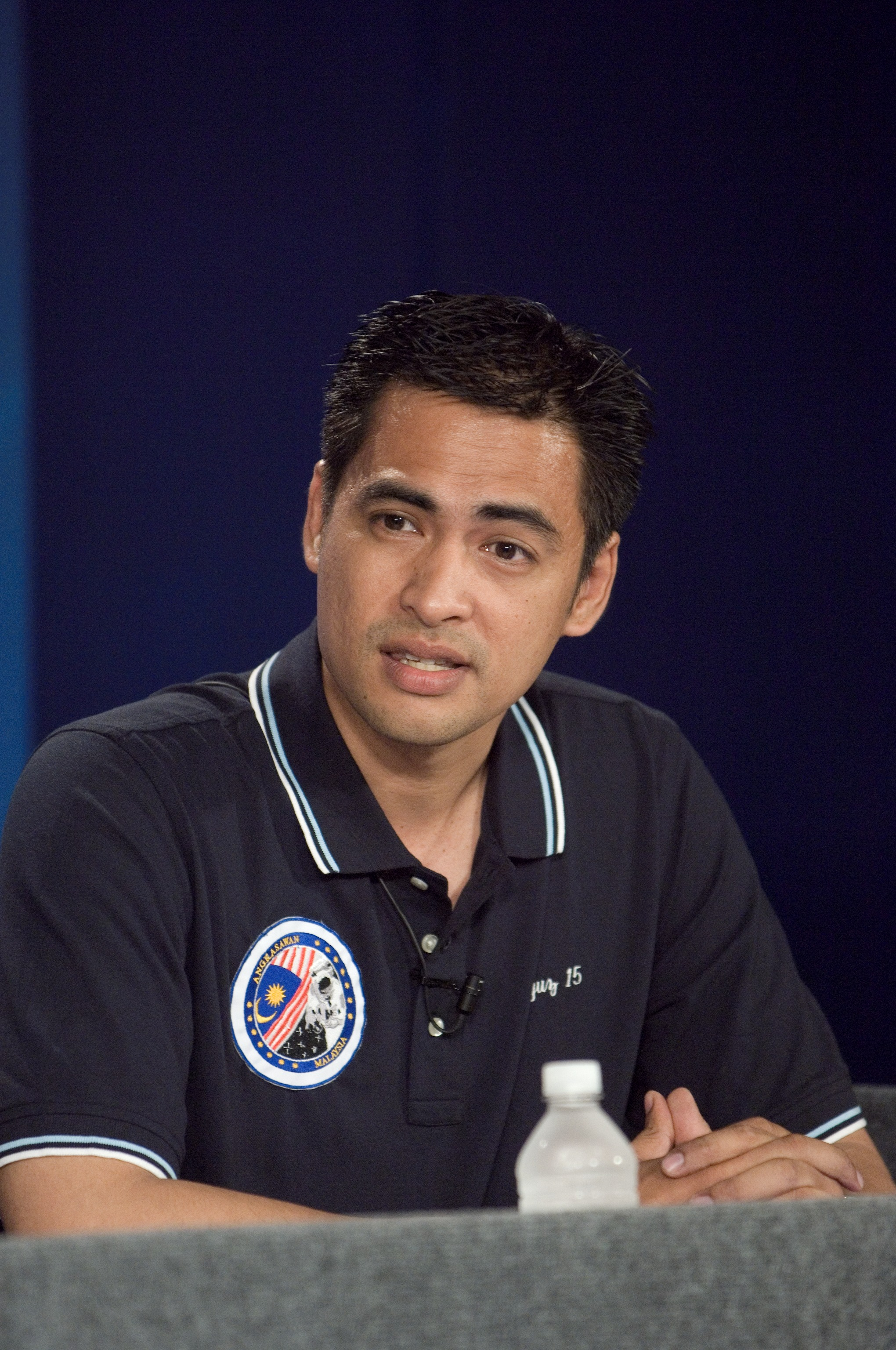
Sheikh Muszaphar Shukor, joint 464th person and the first person from Malaysia to go into space

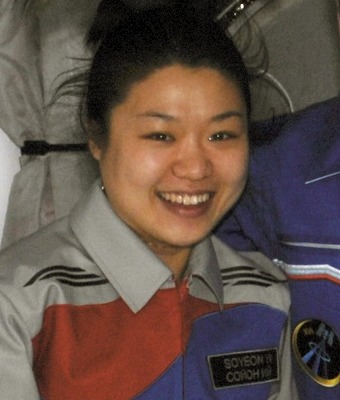
Yi So-yeon, joint 475th person and the first Korean in space

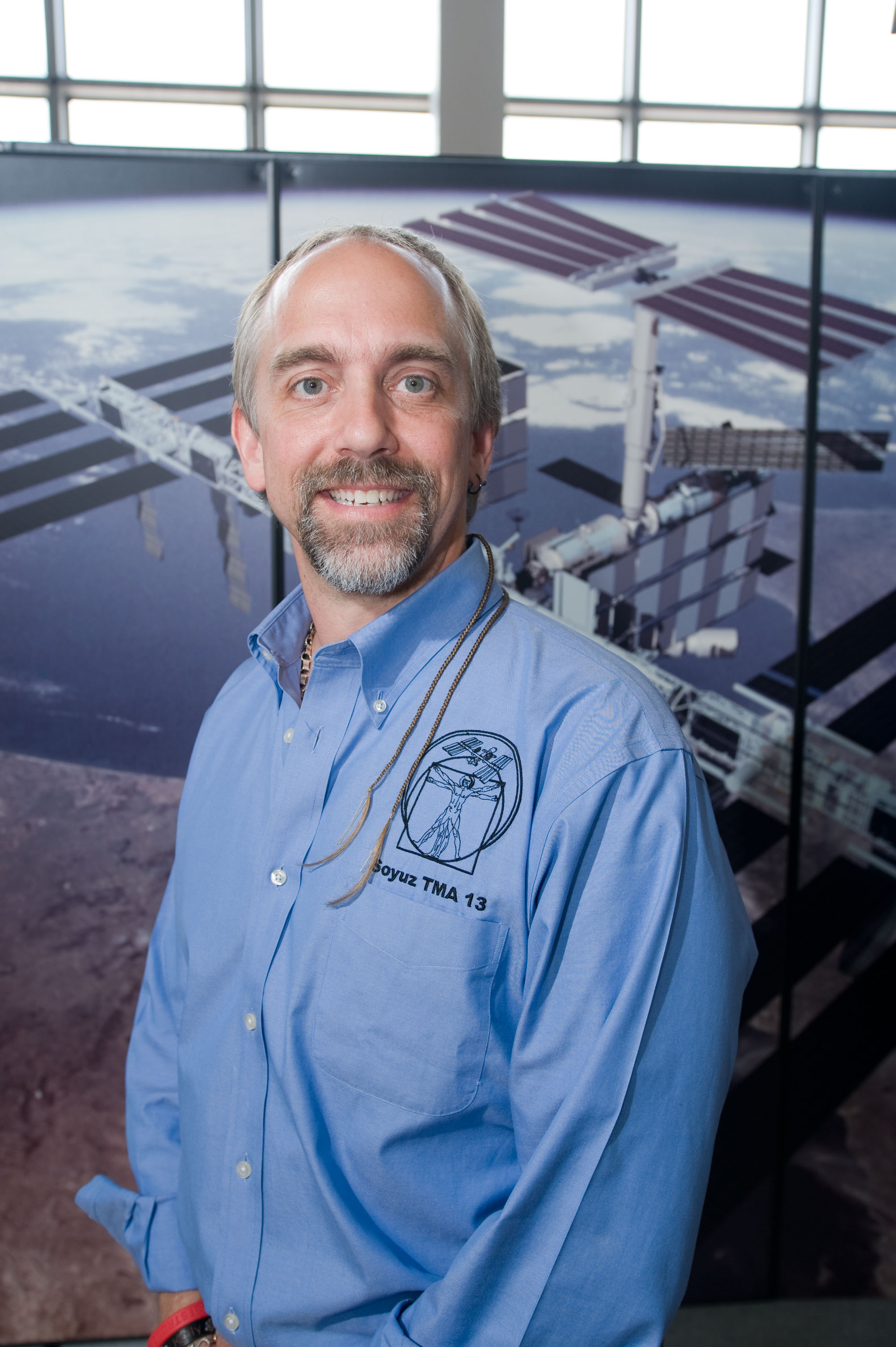
Richard Garriott, 486th person in space and first spacefaring son of an earlier astronaut (Owen Garriott).

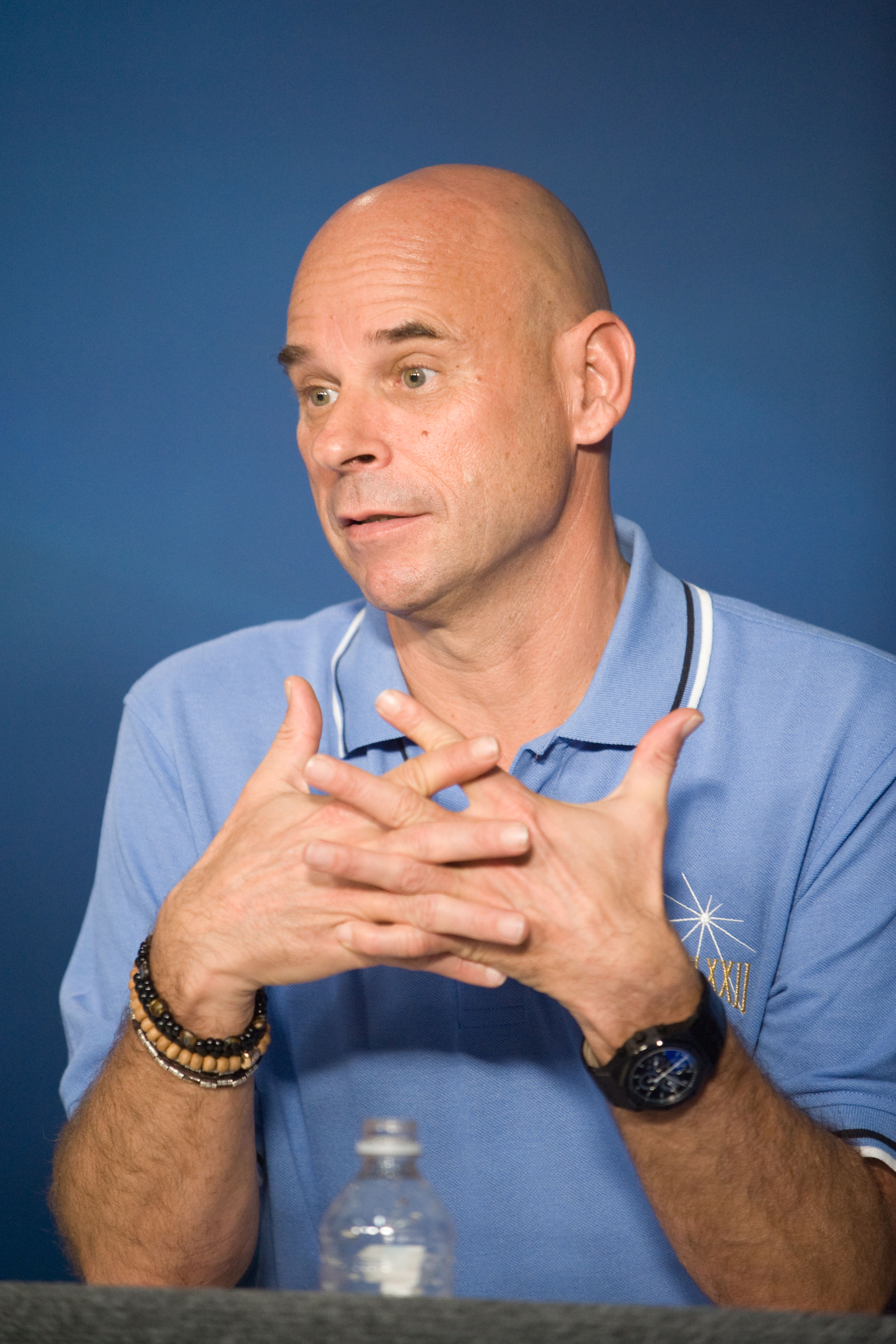
Guy Laliberté, joint 506th person in space and the first Canadian space tourist

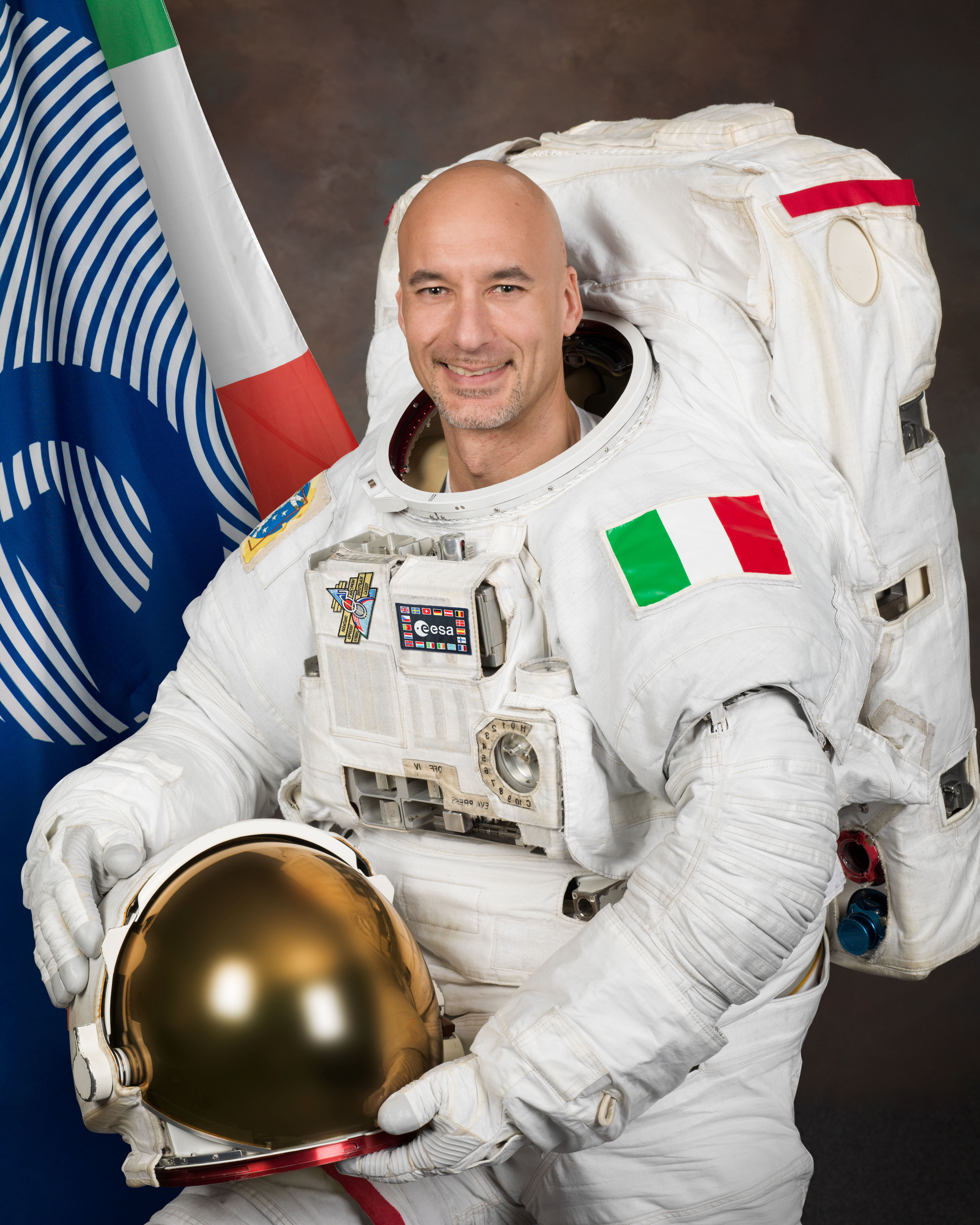
Luca Parmitano, 532nd person in space and first Italian to be commander of an ISS expedition. He has been the youngest astronaut to undertake a long-duration mission. He is the first astronaut from Sicily

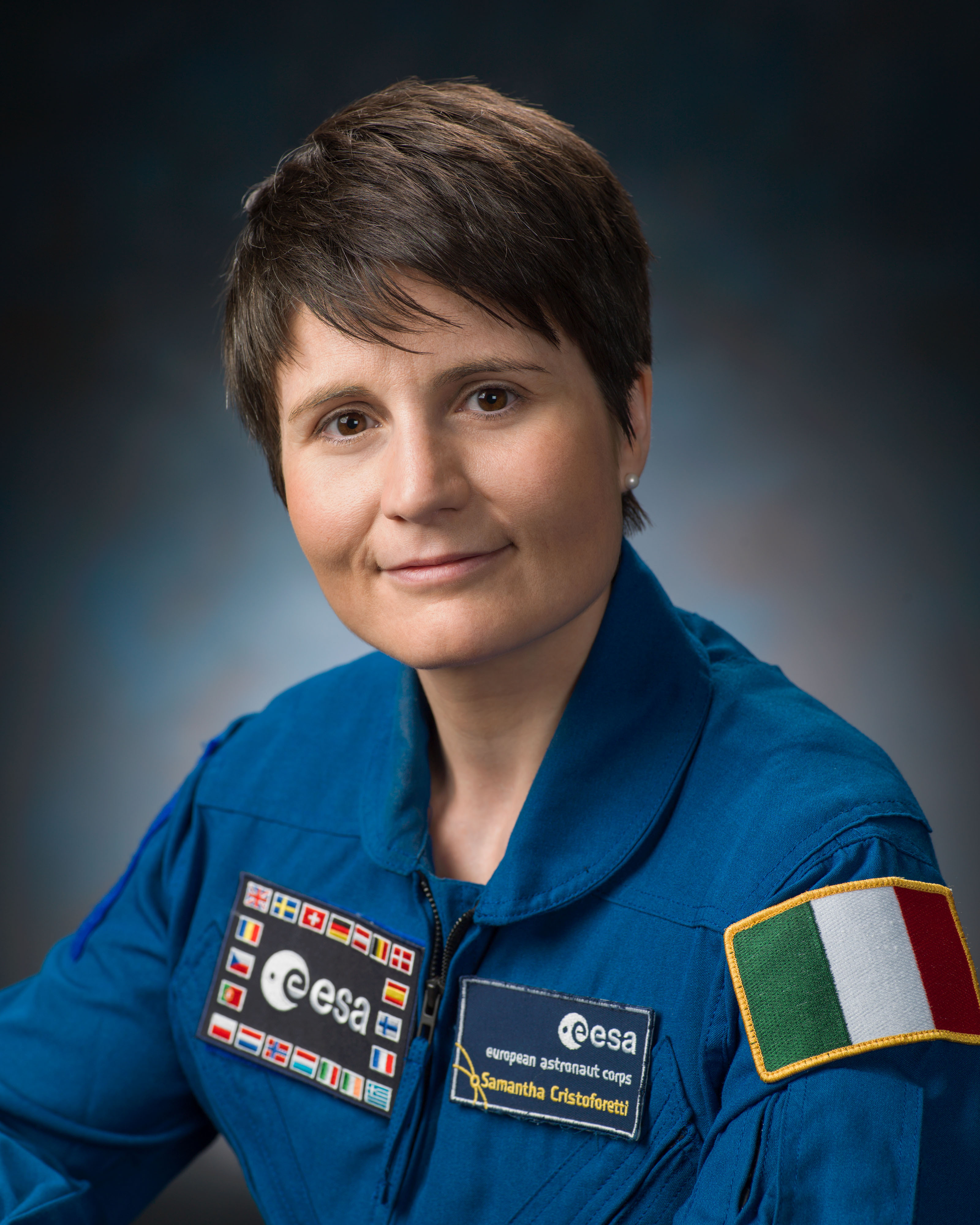
Samantha Cristoforetti, 541st person in space, who has performed the longest single spaceflight by a woman, as of 2015

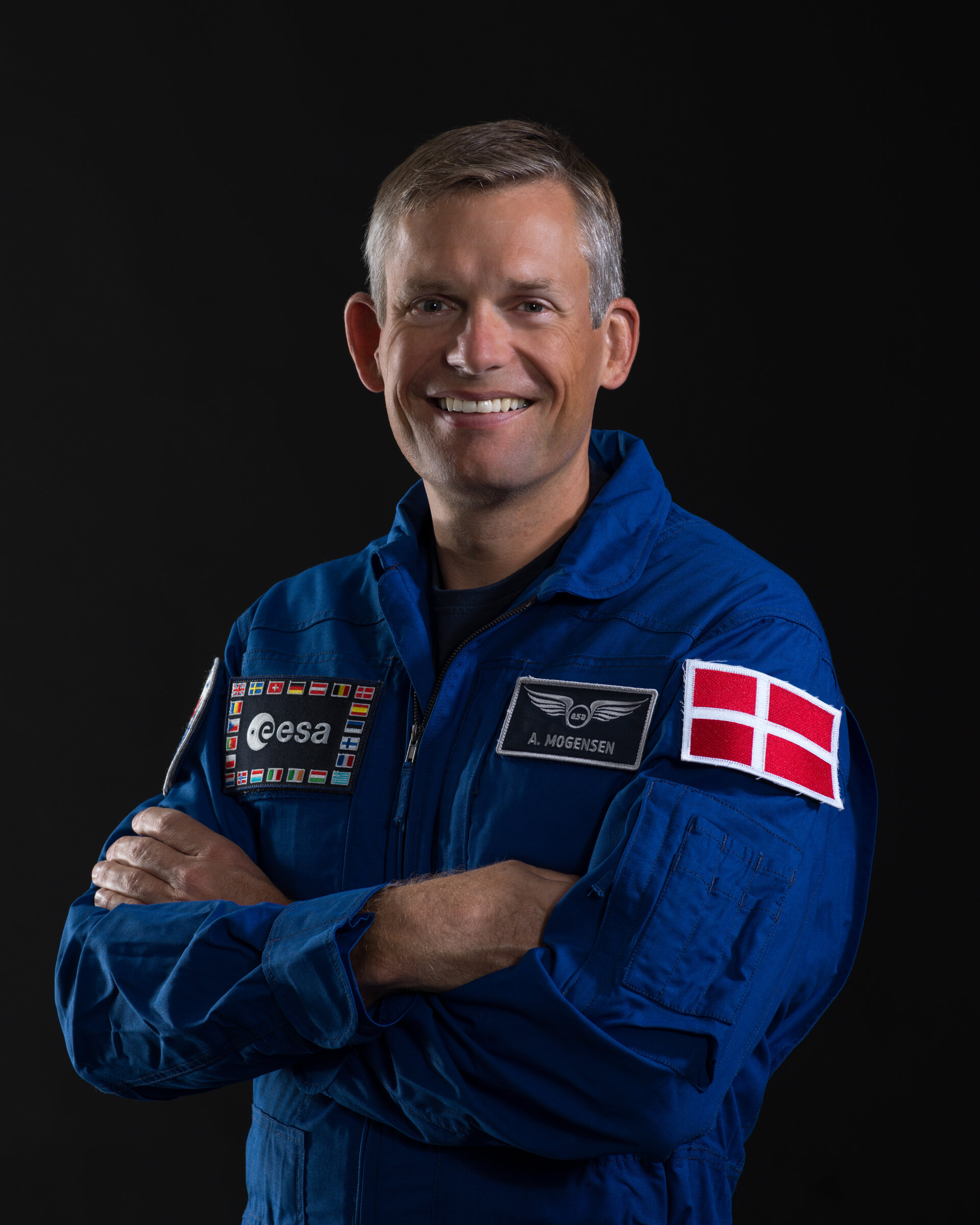
Andreas Mogensen, joint 544th person and the first Dane in space

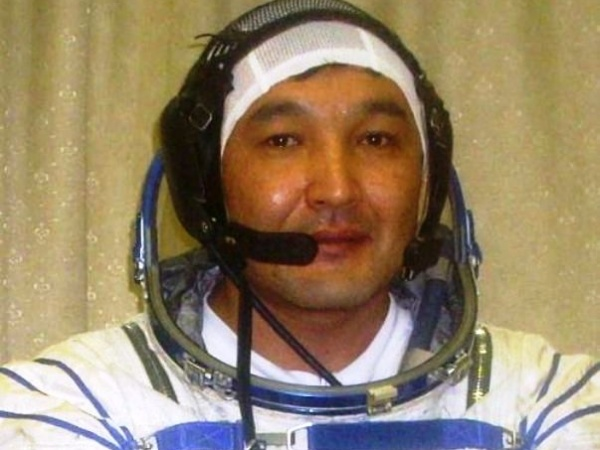
Aidyn Aimbetov, joint 544th person and the first solely Kazakh cosmonaut

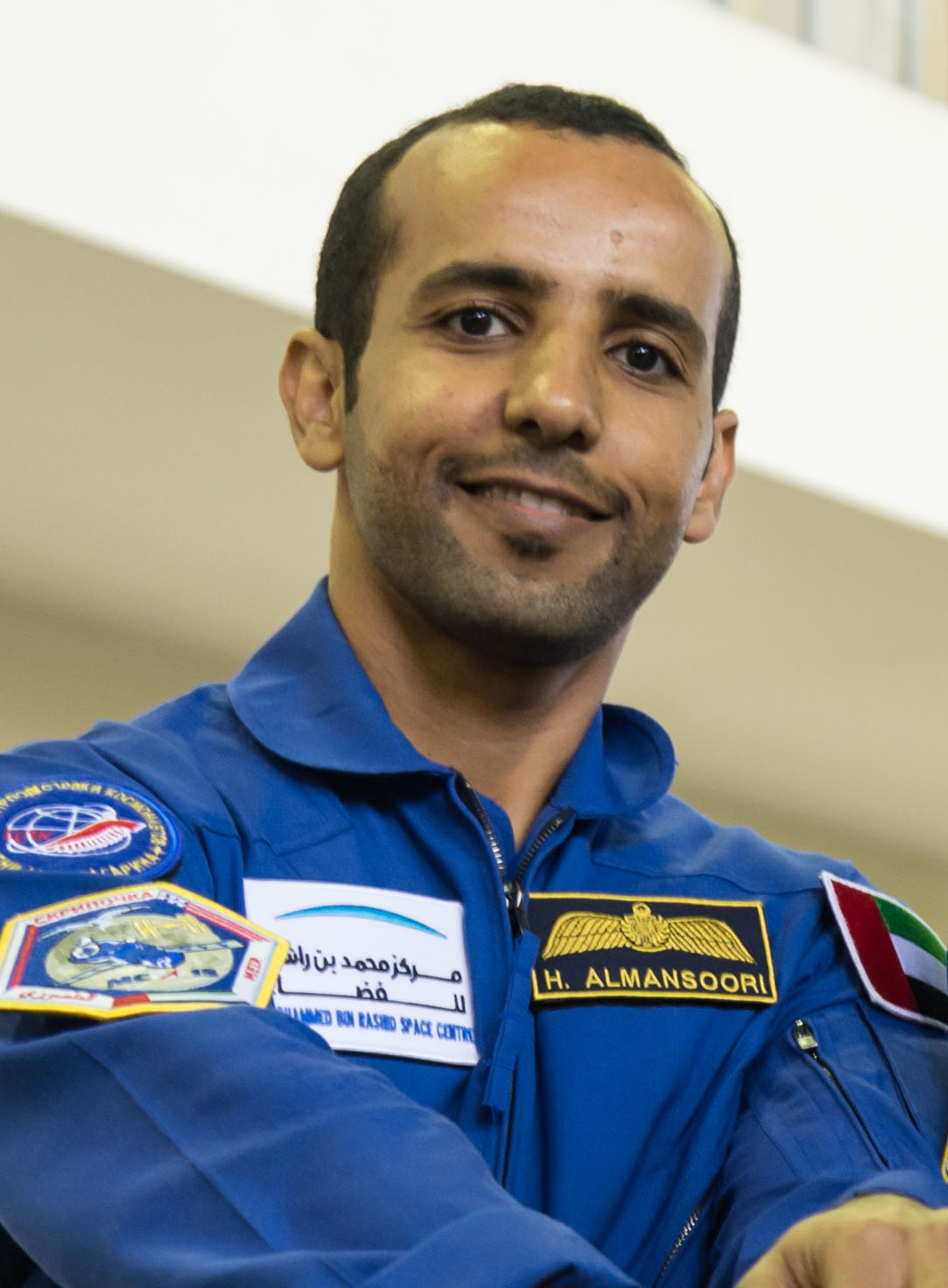
Hazza Al Mansouri, joint 564th person and the first in space from the UAE

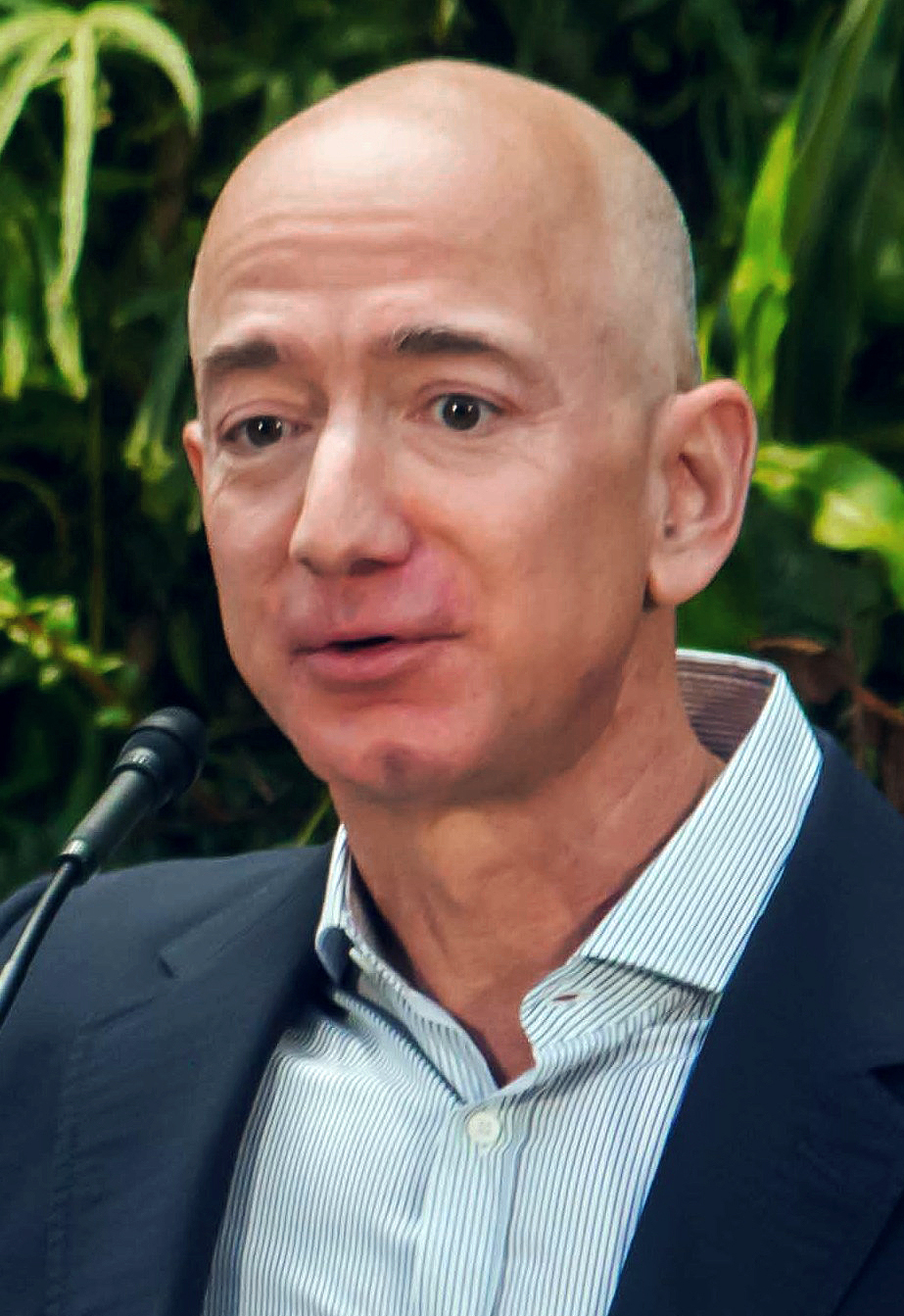
Jeff Bezos, joint 571st person and the founder of spaceflight company Blue Origin

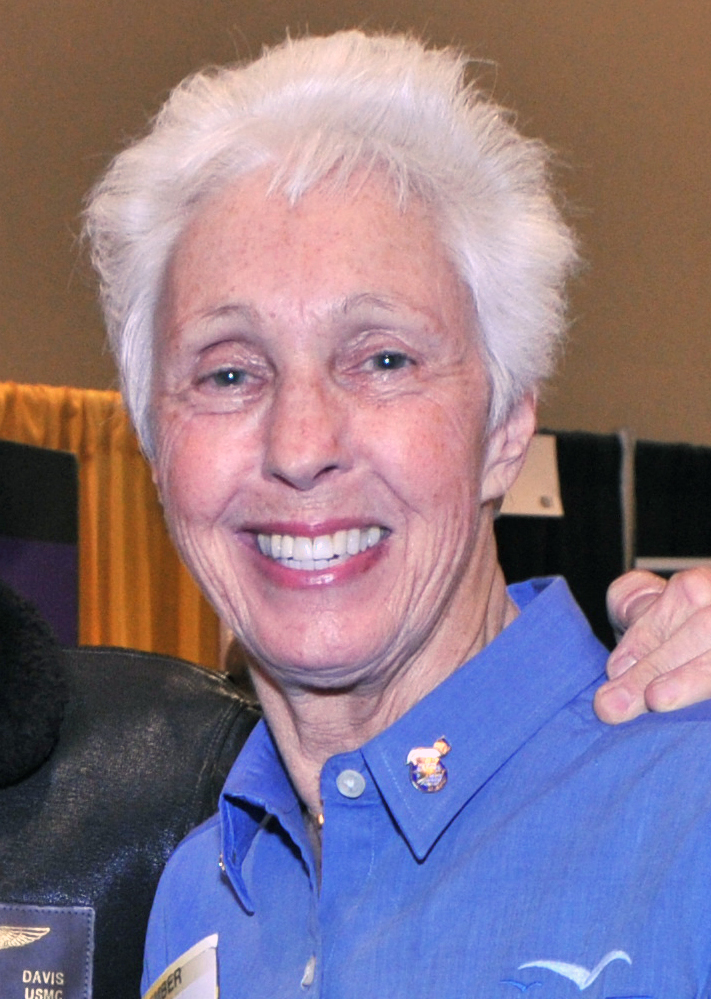
Wally Funk, joint 571st person and oldest woman in space

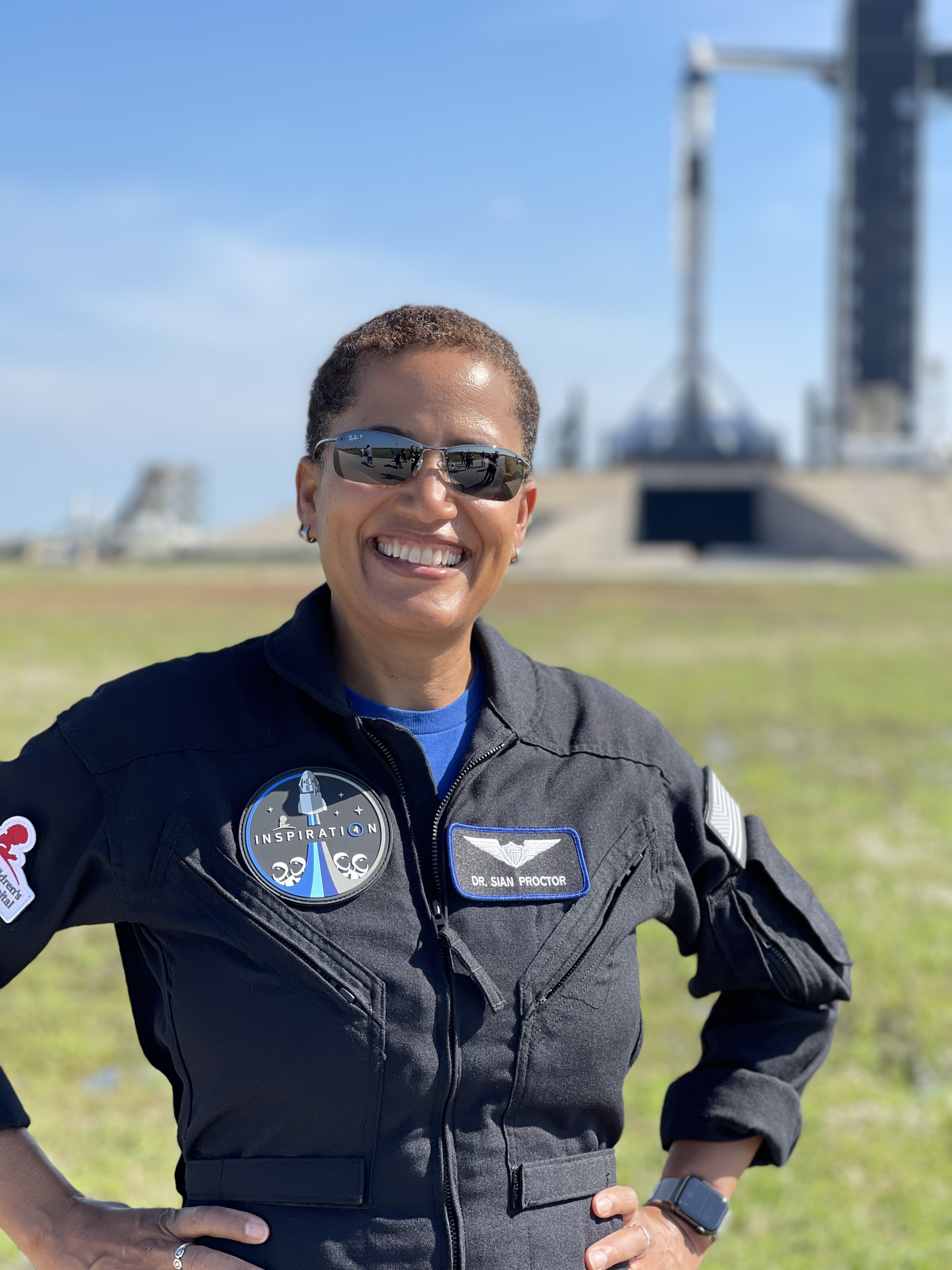
Sian Proctor, joint 575th person and first female commercial astronaut spaceship pilot

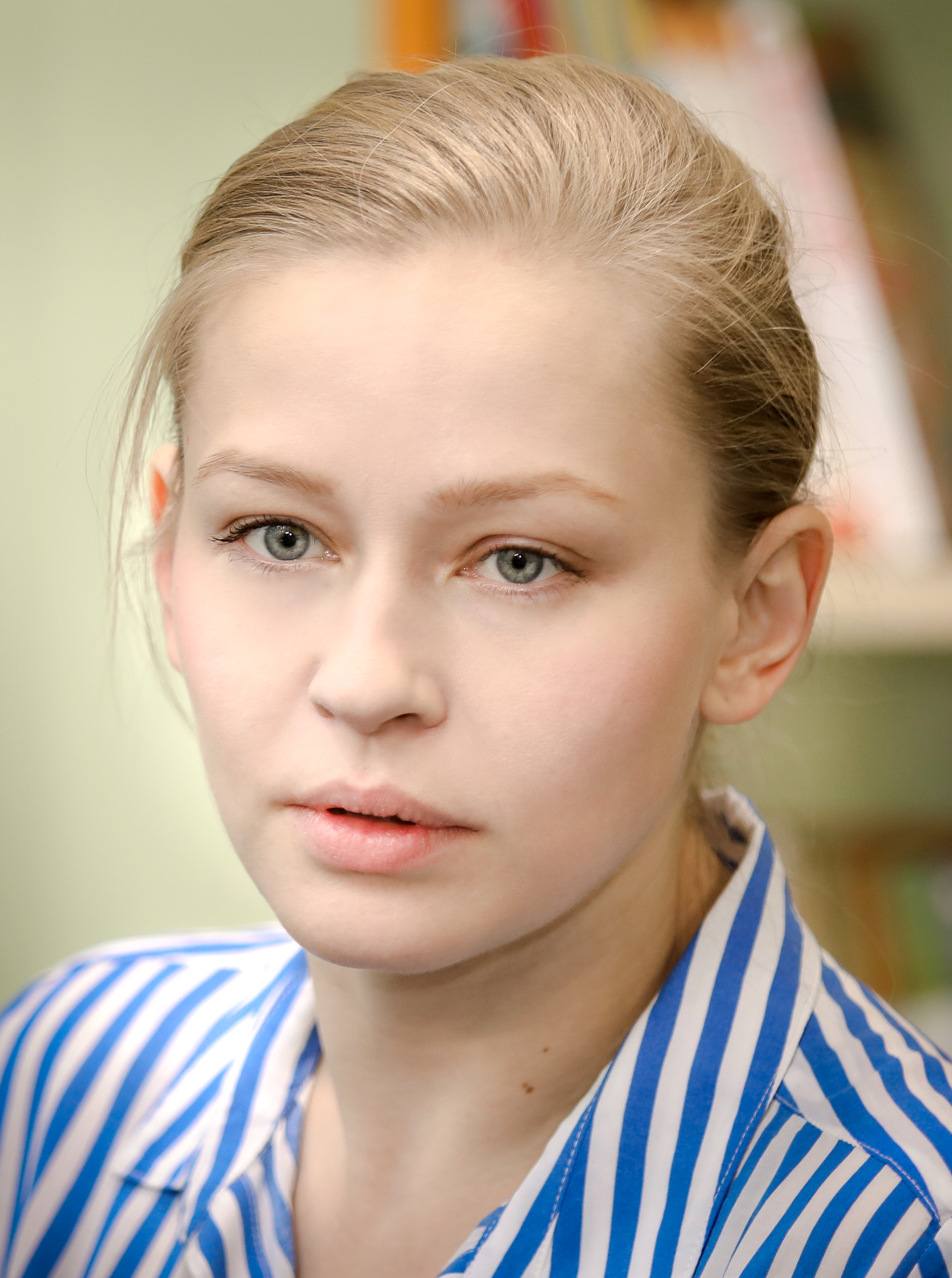
Yulia Peresild, joint 579th person and the first professional actress to perform in space

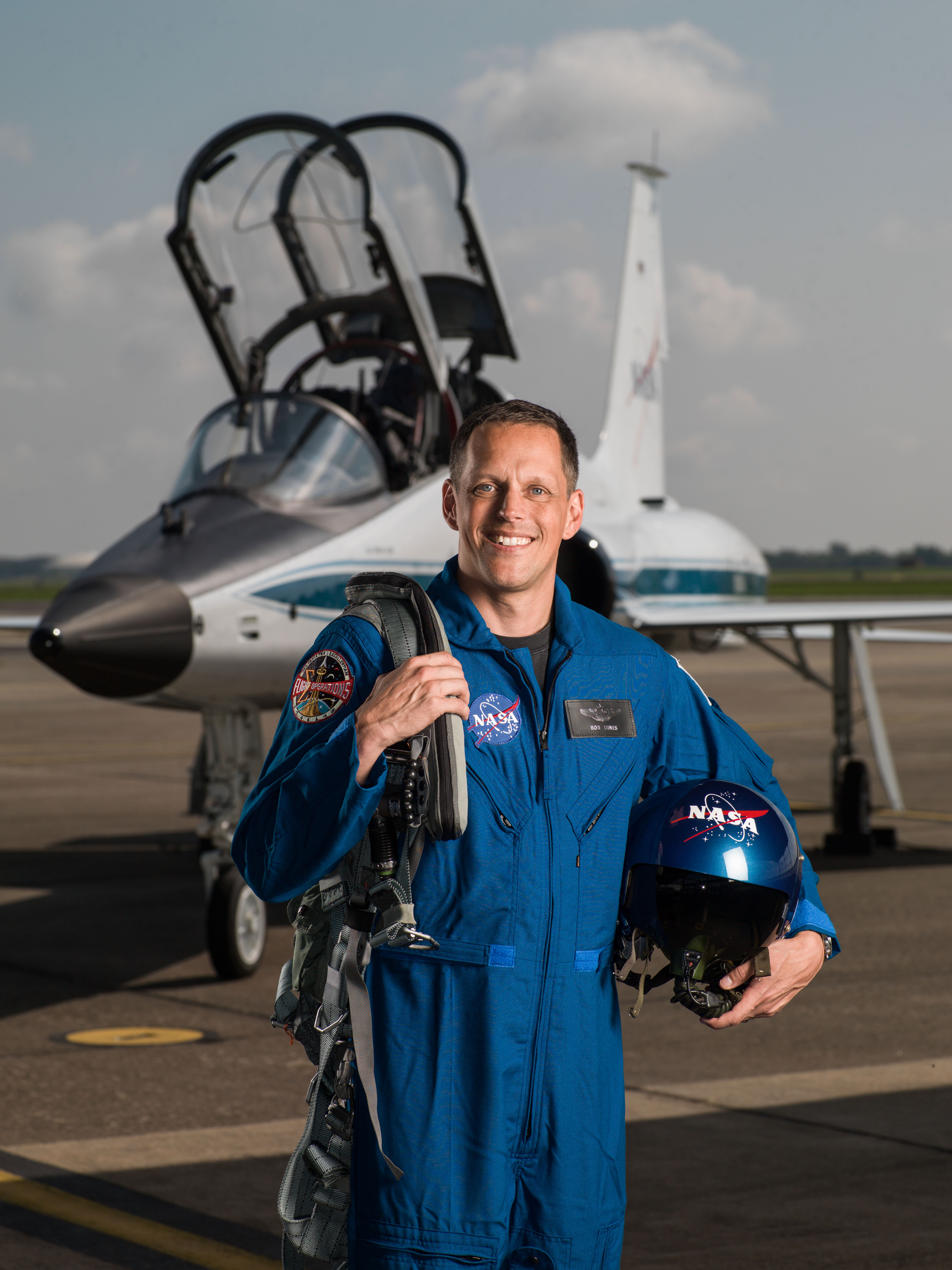
Robert Hines, joint 608th person in space

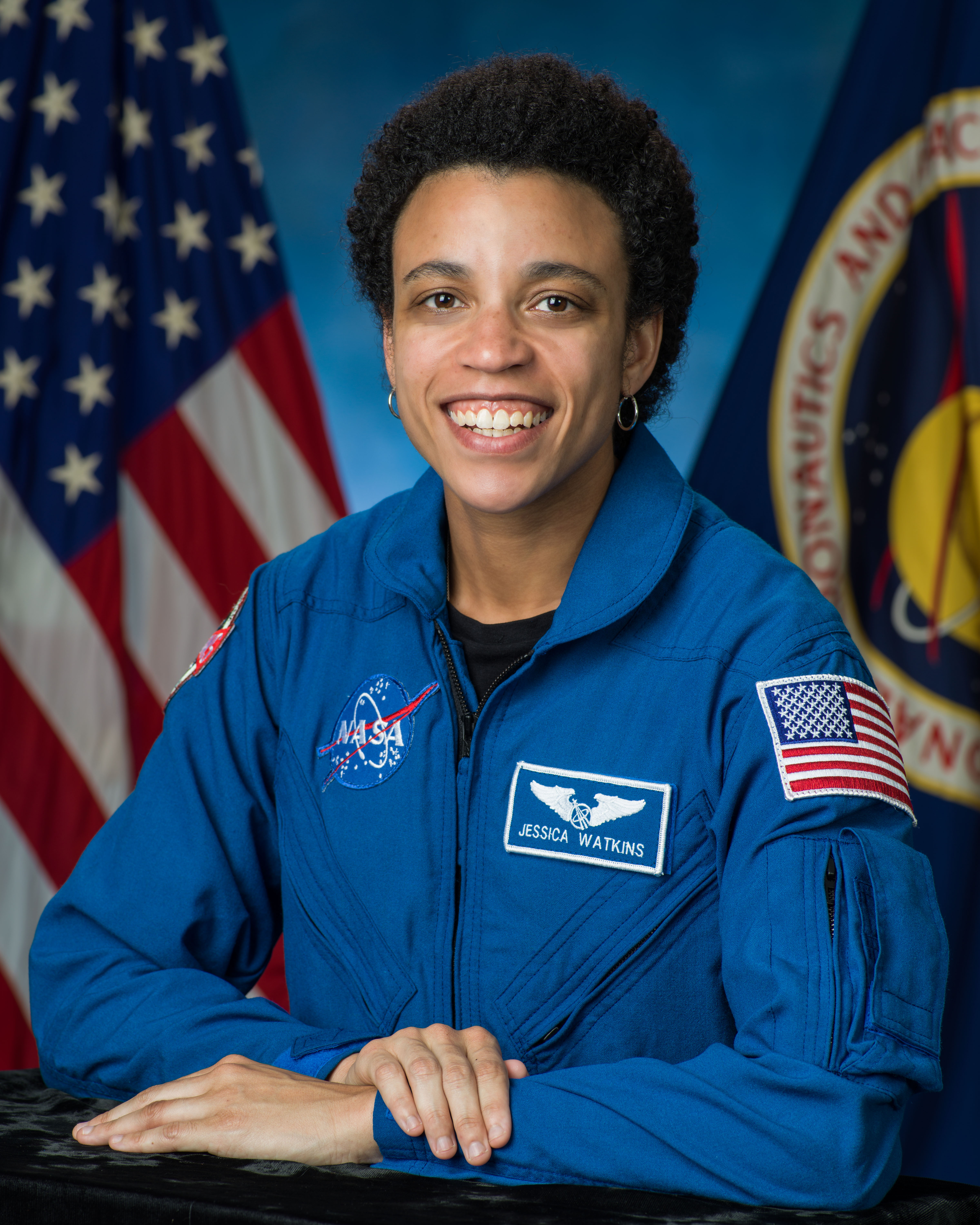
Jessica Watkins, joint 608th person in space and first black woman to join a long-term mission to the International Space Station

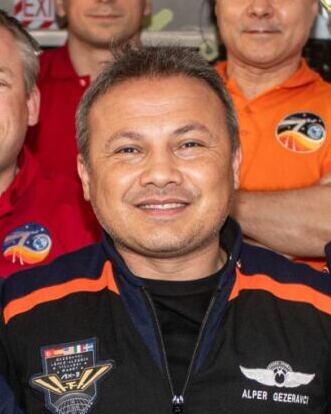
Alper Gezeravci, joint 643rd person and first Turkish person in space

#	Name	Nationality	Date	Flight	Ref.
1	Yuri Gagarin	USSR	12 April 1961	Vostok 1	(Note: The distance of Gagarin's spaceflight exceeded the circumference of the Earth and the total duration of the flight exceeded its orbital period. Due to the rotation of the Earth, Gagarin nevertheless landed west of the Vostok 1 launch site after completing a single orbit.)
2	Alan Shepard ◉▲	United States	5 May 1961	Freedom 7	
3	Virgil Grissom ◉	United States	21 July 1961	Liberty Bell 7	
4	Gherman Titov	USSR	6 August 1961	Vostok 2	
5	John Glenn	United States	20 February 1962	Friendship 7	
6	Scott Carpenter	United States	24 May 1962	Aurora 7	
7	Andriyan Nikolayev	USSR	11 August 1962	Vostok 3	
8	Pavel Popovich	USSR	12 August 1962	Vostok 4	
9	Walter Schirra	United States	3 October 1962	Sigma 7	
10	Gordon Cooper	United States	15 May 1963	Faith 7	
11	Valery Bykovsky	USSR	14 June 1963	Vostok 5	
12	Valentina Tereshkova	USSR	16 June 1963	Vostok 6	
13	Joseph Walker	United States	19 July 1963	X-15 Flight 90	
14	Konstantin Feoktistov	USSR	12 October 1964	Voskhod 1	
14	Vladimir Komarov †	USSR	12 October 1964	Voskhod 1	(Note: Vladimir Komarov died during Soyuz 1.)
14	Boris Yegorov	USSR	12 October 1964	Voskhod 1	
17	Pavel Belyayev	USSR	18 March 1965	Voskhod 2	
17	Alexei Leonov	USSR	18 March 1965	Voskhod 2	
19	John Young △▲	United States	23 March 1965	Gemini 3	
20	James McDivitt	United States	3 June 1965	Gemini 4	
20	Edward White	United States	3 June 1965	Gemini 4	
22	Pete Conrad ▲	United States	21 August 1965	Gemini 5	
23	Frank Borman △	United States	4 December 1965	Gemini 7	
23	James Lovell △△	United States	4 December 1965	Gemini 7	
25	Thomas Stafford △	United States	15 December 1965	Gemini 6A	
26	Neil Armstrong ▲	United States	16 March 1966	Gemini 8	
26	David Scott ▲	United States	16 March 1966	Gemini 8	
28	Eugene Cernan △▲	United States	3 June 1966	Gemini 9A	
29	Michael Collins △	United States	18 July 1966	Gemini 10	
30	Richard Gordon △	United States	12 September 1966	Gemini 11	
31	Edwin Aldrin ▲	United States	11 November 1966	Gemini 12	
32	Walter Cunningham	United States	11 October 1968	Apollo 7	
32	Donn Eisele	United States	11 October 1968	Apollo 7	
34	Georgy Beregovoy	USSR	26 October 1968	Soyuz 3	
35	William Anders △	United States	21 December 1968	Apollo 8	
36	Vladimir Shatalov	USSR	14 January 1969	Soyuz 4	
37	Yevgeny Khrunov	USSR	15 January 1969	Soyuz 5	
37	Boris Volynov	USSR	15 January 1969	Soyuz 5	
37	Aleksei Yeliseyev	USSR	15 January 1969	Soyuz 5	
40	Russell Schweickart	United States	3 March 1969	Apollo 9	
41	Valeri Kubasov	USSR	11 October 1969	Soyuz 6	
41	Georgy Shonin	USSR	11 October 1969	Soyuz 6	
43	Anatoly Filipchenko	USSR	12 October 1969	Soyuz 7	
43	Viktor Gorbatko	USSR	12 October 1969	Soyuz 7	
43	Vladislav Volkov †	USSR	12 October 1969	Soyuz 7	(Note: Soyuz 11 capsule depressurised in orbit.)
46	Alan Bean ▲	United States	14 November 1969	Apollo 12	
47	Fred Haise △	United States	11 April 1970	Apollo 13	
47	Jack Swigert △	United States	11 April 1970	Apollo 13	
49	Vitaly Sevastyanov	USSR	1 June 1970	Soyuz 9	
50	Edgar Mitchell ▲	United States	31 January 1971	Apollo 14	
50	Stuart Roosa △	United States	31 January 1971	Apollo 14	
52	Nikolay Rukavishnikov	USSR	22 April 1971	Soyuz 10	
53	Georgy Dobrovolsky ‡	USSR	6 June 1971	Soyuz 11	
53	Viktor Patsayev ‡	USSR	6 June 1971	Soyuz 11	
55	James Irwin ▲	United States	26 July 1971	Apollo 15	
55	Alfred Worden △	United States	26 July 1971	Apollo 15	
57	Charles Duke ▲	United States	16 April 1972	Apollo 16	
57	Ken Mattingly △	United States	16 April 1972	Apollo 16	
59	Ronald Evans △	United States	7 December 1972	Apollo 17	
59	Harrison Schmitt ▲	United States	7 December 1972	Apollo 17	
61	Joseph Kerwin	United States	25 May 1973	Skylab 2	
61	Paul Weitz	United States	25 May 1973	Skylab 2	
63	Owen Garriott	United States	28 July 1973	Skylab 3	
63	Jack Lousma	United States	28 July 1973	Skylab 3	
65	Vasily Lazarev	USSR	27 September 1973	Soyuz 12	
65	Oleg Makarov	USSR	27 September 1973	Soyuz 12	
67	Gerald Carr	United States	16 November 1973	Skylab 4	
67	Edward Gibson	United States	16 November 1973	Skylab 4	
67	William Pogue	United States	16 November 1973	Skylab 4	
70	Pyotr Klimuk	USSR	18 December 1973	Soyuz 13	
70	Valentin Lebedev	USSR	18 December 1973	Soyuz 13	
72	Yury Artyukhin	USSR	3 July 1974	Soyuz 14	
73	Lev Dyomin	USSR	26 August 1974	Soyuz 15	
73	Gennadi Sarafanov	USSR	26 August 1974	Soyuz 15	
75	Georgy Grechko	USSR	10 January 1975	Soyuz 17	
75	Aleksei Gubarev	USSR	10 January 1975	Soyuz 17	
77	Vance Brand	United States	15 July 1975	ASTP	
77	Donald Slayton	United States	15 July 1975	ASTP	
79	Vitaly Zholobov	USSR	6 July 1976	Soyuz 21	
80	Vladimir Aksyonov	USSR	15 September 1976	Soyuz 22	
81	Valery Rozhdestvensky	USSR	14 October 1976	Soyuz 23	
81	Vyacheslav Zudov	USSR	14 October 1976	Soyuz 23	
83	Yury Glazkov	USSR	7 February 1977	Soyuz 24	
84	Vladimir Kovalyonok	USSR	9 October 1977	Soyuz 25	
84	Valery Ryumin	USSR	9 October 1977	Soyuz 25	
86	Yury Romanenko	USSR	10 December 1977	Soyuz 26	
87	Vladimir Dzhanibekov	USSR	10 January 1978	Soyuz 27	
88	Vladimír Remek	Czechoslovakia	2 March 1978	Soyuz 28	
89	Aleksandr Ivanchenkov	USSR	15 June 1978	Soyuz 29	
90	Mirosław Hermaszewski	Poland	27 June 1978	Soyuz 30	
91	Sigmund Jähn	East Germany	26 August 1978	Soyuz 31	
92	Vladimir Lyakhov	USSR	25 February 1979	Soyuz 32	
93	Georgi Ivanov	Bulgaria	10 April 1979	Soyuz 33	
94	Leonid Popov	USSR	9 April 1980	Soyuz 35	
95	Bertalan Farkas	Hungary	26 May 1980	Soyuz 36	
96	Yury Malyshev	USSR	5 June 1980	Soyuz T-2	
97	Phạm Tuân	Vietnam	23 July 1980	Soyuz 37	
98	Arnaldo Tamayo Méndez	Cuba	18 September 1980	Soyuz 38	
99	Leonid Kizim	USSR	27 November 1980	Soyuz T-3	
99	Gennadi Strekalov	USSR	27 November 1980	Soyuz T-3	
101	Viktor Savinykh	USSR	12 March 1981	Soyuz T-4	
102	Jügderdemidiin Gürragchaa	Mongolia	22 March 1981	Soyuz 39	
103	Robert Crippen	United States	12 April 1981	STS-1	
104	Dumitru Prunariu	Romania	14 May 1981	Soyuz 40	
105	Joseph Engle	United States	12 November 1981	STS-2	
105	Richard Truly	United States	12 November 1981	STS-2	
107	Charles Fullerton	United States	22 March 1982	STS-3	
108	Anatoly Berezovoy	USSR	13 May 1982	Soyuz T-5	
109	Jean-Loup Chrétien	France	24 June 1982	Soyuz T-6	
110	Henry Hartsfield	United States	27 June 1982	STS-4	
111	Svetlana Savitskaya	USSR	19 August 1982	Soyuz T-7	
111	Aleksandr Serebrov	USSR	19 August 1982	Soyuz T-7	
113	Joseph Allen	United States	11 November 1982	STS-5	
113	William Lenoir	United States	11 November 1982	STS-5	
113	Robert Overmyer	United States	11 November 1982	STS-5	
116	Karol Bobko	United States	4 April 1983	STS-6	
116	Story Musgrave	United States	4 April 1983	STS-6	
116	Donald Peterson	United States	4 April 1983	STS-6	
119	Vladimir Titov	USSR	20 April 1983	Soyuz T-8	
120	John Fabian	United States	18 June 1983	STS-7	
120	Frederick Hauck	United States	18 June 1983	STS-7	
120	Sally Ride	United States	18 June 1983	STS-7	
120	Norman Thagard	United States	18 June 1983	STS-7	
124	Aleksandr Pavlovich Aleksandrov	USSR	27 June 1983	Soyuz T-9	
125	Guion Bluford	United States	30 August 1983	STS-8	
125	Daniel Brandenstein	United States	30 August 1983	STS-8	
125	Dale Gardner	United States	30 August 1983	STS-8	
125	William Thornton	United States	30 August 1983	STS-8	
129	Byron Lichtenberg	United States	28 November 1983	STS-9	
129	Robert Parker	United States	28 November 1983	STS-9	
129	Brewster Shaw	United States	28 November 1983	STS-9	
129	Ulf Merbold	West Germany	28 November 1983	STS-9	
133	Robert Gibson	United States	3 February 1984	STS-41-B	
133	Bruce McCandless	United States	3 February 1984	STS-41-B	
133	Ronald McNair †	United States	3 February 1984	STS-41-B	(Note: See the Space Shuttle Challenger disaster.)
133	Robert Stewart	United States	3 February 1984	STS-41-B	
137	Oleg Atkov	USSR	8 February 1984	Soyuz T-10	
137	Vladimir Solovyov	USSR	8 February 1984	Soyuz T-10	
139	Rakesh Sharma	India	3 April 1984	Soyuz T-11	
140	Terry Hart	United States	6 April 1984	STS-41-C	
140	George Nelson	United States	6 April 1984	STS-41-C	
140	Francis Scobee †	United States	6 April 1984	STS-41-C	
140	James van Hoften	United States	6 April 1984	STS-41-C	
144	Igor Volk	USSR	17 July 1984	Soyuz T-12	
145	Michael Coats	United States	30 August 1984	STS-41-D	
145	Steven Hawley	United States	30 August 1984	STS-41-D	
145	Richard Mullane	United States	30 August 1984	STS-41-D	
145	Judith Resnik †	United States	30 August 1984	STS-41-D	
145	Charles Walker	United States	30 August 1984	STS-41-D	
150	Marc Garneau	Canada	5 October 1984	STS-41-G	
150	David Leestma	United States	5 October 1984	STS-41-G	
150	Jon McBride	United States	5 October 1984	STS-41-G	
150	Paul Scully-Power	United States	5 October 1984	STS-41-G	
150	Kathryn Sullivan	United States	5 October 1984	STS-41-G	
155	Anna Fisher	United States	8 November 1984	STS-51-A	
155	David Walker	United States	8 November 1984	STS-51-A	
157	James Buchli	United States	24 January 1985	STS-51-C	
157	Ellison Onizuka †	United States	24 January 1985	STS-51-C	
157	Gary Payton	United States	24 January 1985	STS-51-C	
157	Loren Shriver	United States	24 January 1985	STS-51-C	
161	Edwin Garn	United States	12 April 1985	STS-51-D	
161	Stanley Griggs	United States	12 April 1985	STS-51-D	
161	Jeffrey Hoffman	United States	12 April 1985	STS-51-D	
161	Margaret Seddon	United States	12 April 1985	STS-51-D	
161	Donald Williams	United States	12 April 1985	STS-51-D	
166	Frederick Gregory	United States	29 April 1985	STS-51-B	
166	Don Lind	United States	29 April 1985	STS-51-B	
166	Lodewijk van den Berg	United States	29 April 1985	STS-51-B	(Note: Lodewijk van den Berg was a naturalised United States citizen at the time of his flight, having been born in the Netherlands.)
166	Taylor Wang	United States	29 April 1985	STS-51-B	
170	Sultan Al-Saud	Saudi Arabia	17 June 1985	STS-51-G	
170	Patrick Baudry	France	17 June 1985	STS-51-G	
170	John Creighton	United States	17 June 1985	STS-51-G	
170	Shannon Lucid	United States	17 June 1985	STS-51-G	
170	Steven Nagel	United States	17 June 1985	STS-51-G	
175	Loren Acton	United States	29 July 1985	STS-51-F	
175	John Bartoe	United States	29 July 1985	STS-51-F	
175	Roy Bridges	United States	29 July 1985	STS-51-F	
175	Anthony England	United States	29 July 1985	STS-51-F	
175	Karl Henize	United States	29 July 1985	STS-51-F	
180	Richard Covey	United States	27 August 1985	STS-51-I	
180	William Fisher	United States	27 August 1985	STS-51-I	
180	John Lounge	United States	27 August 1985	STS-51-I	
183	Vladimir Vasyutin	USSR	17 September 1985	Soyuz T-14	
183	Aleksandr Volkov	USSR	17 September 1985	Soyuz T-14	
185	Ronald Grabe	United States	3 October 1985	STS-51-J	
185	David Hilmers	United States	3 October 1985	STS-51-J	
185	William Pailes	United States	3 October 1985	STS-51-J	
188	Bonnie Dunbar	United States	30 October 1985	STS-61-A	
188	Reinhard Furrer	West Germany	30 October 1985	STS-61-A	
188	Ernst Messerschmid	West Germany	30 October 1985	STS-61-A	
188	Wubbo Ockels	Netherlands	30 October 1985	STS-61-A	
192	Mary Cleave	United States	27 November 1985	STS-61-B	
192	Rodolfo Neri Vela	Mexico	27 November 1985	STS-61-B	
192	Bryan O'Connor	United States	27 November 1985	STS-61-B	
192	Jerry Ross	United States	27 November 1985	STS-61-B	
192	Sherwood Spring	United States	27 November 1985	STS-61-B	
197	Charles Bolden	United States	12 January 1986	STS-61-C	
197	Robert Cenker	United States	12 January 1986	STS-61-C	
197	Franklin Chang-Díaz	United States	12 January 1986	STS-61-C	(Note: Franklin Chang Díaz is a dual national of the United States and Costa Rica, but flew under the United States flag.)
197	Bill Nelson	United States	12 January 1986	STS-61-C	
—	Michael J. Smith ‡ ⊗	United States	28 January 1986	STS-51-L	
—	Gregory Jarvis ‡ ⊗	United States	28 January 1986	STS-51-L	
—	Christa McAuliffe ‡ ⊗	United States	28 January 1986	STS-51-L	
201	Aleksandr Laveykin	USSR	5 February 1987	Soyuz TM-2	
202	Muhammed Faris	(Ba'athist Syria) Syria	22 July 1987	Soyuz TM-3	
202	Aleksandr Viktorenko	USSR	22 July 1987	Soyuz TM-3	
204	Anatoly Levchenko	USSR	21 December 1987	Soyuz TM-4	
204	Musa Manarov	USSR	21 December 1987	Soyuz TM-4	
206	Aleksandr Panayotov Aleksandrov	Bulgaria	7 June 1988	Soyuz TM-5	
206	Anatoly Solovyev	USSR	7 June 1988	Soyuz TM-5	
208	Abdul Mohmand	Afghanistan	29 August 1988	Soyuz TM-6	
208	Valeri Polyakov	USSR	29 August 1988	Soyuz TM-6	
210	Sergei Krikalev	USSR	26 November 1988	Soyuz TM-7	
211	Guy Gardner	United States	2 December 1988	STS-27	
211	William Shepherd	United States	2 December 1988	STS-27	
213	James Bagian	United States	13 March 1989	STS-29	
213	John Blaha	United States	13 March 1989	STS-29	
213	Robert Springer	United States	13 March 1989	STS-29	
216	Mark Lee	United States	4 May 1989	STS-30	
217	James Adamson	United States	8 August 1989	STS-28	
217	Mark Brown	United States	8 August 1989	STS-28	
217	Richard Richards	United States	8 August 1989	STS-28	
220	Ellen Baker	United States	18 October 1989	STS-34	
220	Michael McCulley	United States	18 October 1989	STS-34	
222	Manley Carter	United States	23 November 1989	STS-33	
222	Kathryn Thornton	United States	23 November 1989	STS-33	
224	Marsha Ivins	United States	9 January 1990	STS-32	
224	George Low	United States	9 January 1990	STS-32	
224	James Wetherbee	United States	9 January 1990	STS-32	
227	Aleksandr Balandin	USSR	11 February 1990	Soyuz TM-9	
228	John Casper	United States	28 February 1990	STS-36	
228	Pierre Thuot	United States	28 February 1990	STS-36	
230	Gennadi Manakov	USSR	1 August 1990	Soyuz TM-10	
231	Thomas Akers	United States	6 October 1990	STS-41	
231	Robert Cabana	United States	6 October 1990	STS-41	
231	Bruce Melnick	United States	6 October 1990	STS-41	
234	Frank Culbertson	United States	15 November 1990	STS-38	
234	Charles Gemar	United States	15 November 1990	STS-38	
234	Carl Meade	United States	15 November 1990	STS-38	
237	Samuel Durrance	United States	2 December 1990	STS-35	
237	Ronald Parise	United States	2 December 1990	STS-35	
239	Viktor Afanasyev	USSR	2 December 1990	Soyuz TM-11	
239	Toyohiro Akiyama	Japan	2 December 1990	Soyuz TM-11	
241	Jerome Apt	United States	5 April 1991	STS-37	
241	Kenneth Cameron	United States	5 April 1991	STS-37	
241	Linda Godwin	United States	5 April 1991	STS-37	
244	Lloyd Hammond	United States	28 April 1991	STS-39	
244	Gregory Harbaugh	United States	28 April 1991	STS-39	
244	Richard Hieb	United States	28 April 1991	STS-39	
244	Donald McMonagle	United States	28 April 1991	STS-39	
244	Charles Veach	United States	28 April 1991	STS-39	
249	Anatoly Artsebarsky	USSR	18 May 1991	Soyuz TM-12	
249	Helen Sharman	United Kingdom	18 May 1991	Soyuz TM-12	
251	Francis Gaffney	United States	5 June 1991	STS-40	
251	Sidney Gutierrez	United States	5 June 1991	STS-40	
251	Millie Hughes-Fulford	United States	5 June 1991	STS-40	
251	Tamara Jernigan	United States	5 June 1991	STS-40	
255	Michael Baker	United States	2 August 1991	STS-43	
256	Kenneth Reightler	United States	12 September 1991	STS-48	
257	Toktar Aubakirov	USSR	2 October 1991	Soyuz TM-13	(Note: Toktar Aubakirov returned to Earth prior to the dissolution of the Soviet Union, upon which he became a Kazakh citizen.)
257	Franz Viehböck	Austria	2 October 1991	Soyuz TM-13	
259	Thomas Hennen	United States	24 November 1991	STS-44	
259	Terence Henricks	United States	24 November 1991	STS-44	
259	Mario Runco	United States	24 November 1991	STS-44	
259	James Voss	United States	24 November 1991	STS-44	
263	Roberta Bondar	Canada	22 January 1992	STS-42	
263	Stephen Oswald	United States	22 January 1992	STS-42	
263	William Readdy	United States	22 January 1992	STS-42	
266	Klaus-Dietrich Flade	Germany	17 March 1992	Soyuz TM-14	
266	Aleksandr Kaleri	Russia	17 March 1992	Soyuz TM-14	
268	Brian Duffy	United States	24 March 1992	STS-45	
268	Michael Foale	United States	24 March 1992	STS-45	(Note: Michael Foale is a dual national of the United States and the United Kingdom, but flew under the United States flag.)
268	Dirk Frimout	Belgium	24 March 1992	STS-45	
271	Kevin Chilton	United States	7 May 1992	STS-49	
272	Kenneth Bowersox	United States	25 June 1992	STS-50	
272	Lawrence DeLucas	United States	25 June 1992	STS-50	
272	Eugene Trinh	United States	25 June 1992	STS-50	
275	Sergei Avdeyev	Russia	27 July 1992	Soyuz TM-15	
275	Michel Tognini	France	27 July 1992	Soyuz TM-15	
277	Andrew Allen	United States	31 July 1992	STS-46	
277	Franco Malerba	Italy	31 July 1992	STS-46	
277	Claude Nicollier	Switzerland	31 July 1992	STS-46	
280	Curtis Brown	United States	12 September 1992	STS-47	
280	Nancy Davis	United States	12 September 1992	STS-47	
280	Mae Jemison	United States	12 September 1992	STS-47	
280	Mamoru Mohri	Japan	12 September 1992	STS-47	
284	Steven MacLean	Canada	22 October 1992	STS-52	
285	Michael Clifford	United States	2 December 1992	STS-53	
286	Susan Helms	United States	13 January 1993	STS-54	
287	Aleksandr Poleshchuk	Russia	24 January 1993	Soyuz TM-16	
288	Kenneth Cockrell	United States	8 April 1993	STS-56	
288	Ellen Ochoa	United States	8 April 1993	STS-56	
290	Bernard Harris	United States	26 April 1993	STS-55	
290	Charles Precourt	United States	26 April 1993	STS-55	
290	Hans Schlegel	Germany	26 April 1993	STS-55	
290	Ulrich Walter	Germany	26 April 1993	STS-55	
294	Nancy Currie	United States	21 June 1993	STS-57	
294	Janice Voss	United States	21 June 1993	STS-57	
294	Peter Wisoff	United States	21 June 1993	STS-57	
297	Jean-Pierre Haigneré	France	1 July 1993	Soyuz TM-17	
297	Vasily Tsibliyev	Russia	1 July 1993	Soyuz TM-17	
299	Daniel Bursch	United States	12 September 1993	STS-51	
299	James Newman	United States	12 September 1993	STS-51	
299	Carl Walz	United States	12 September 1993	STS-51	
302	Martin Fettman	United States	18 October 1993	STS-58	
302	William McArthur	United States	18 October 1993	STS-58	
302	Richard Searfoss	United States	18 October 1993	STS-58	
302	David Wolf	United States	18 October 1993	STS-58	
306	Yury Usachov	Russia	8 January 1994	Soyuz TM-18	
307	Ronald Sega	United States	3 February 1994	STS-60	
308	Thomas Jones	United States	9 April 1994	STS-59	
309	Yuri Malenchenko	Russia	1 July 1994	Soyuz TM-19	
309	Talgat Musabayev	Kazakhstan	1 July 1994	Soyuz TM-19	
311	Leroy Chiao	United States	8 July 1994	STS-65	
311	James Halsell	United States	8 July 1994	STS-65	
311	Chiaki Mukai	Japan	8 July 1994	STS-65	
311	Donald Thomas	United States	8 July 1994	STS-65	
315	Jerry Linenger	United States	9 September 1994	STS-64	
316	Steven Smith	United States	30 September 1994	STS-68	
316	Terrence Wilcutt	United States	30 September 1994	STS-68	
318	Yelena Kondakova	Russia	3 October 1994	Soyuz TM-20	
319	Jean-François Clervoy	France	3 November 1994	STS-66	
319	Scott Parazynski	United States	3 November 1994	STS-66	
319	Joseph Tanner	United States	3 November 1994	STS-66	
322	Eileen Collins	United States	3 February 1995	STS-63	
323	William Gregory	United States	2 March 1995	STS-67	
323	John Grunsfeld	United States	2 March 1995	STS-67	
323	Wendy Lawrence	United States	2 March 1995	STS-67	
326	Vladimir Dezhurov	Russia	14 March 1995	Soyuz TM-21	
327	Nikolai Budarin	Russia	27 June 1995	STS-71	
328	Kevin Kregel	United States	13 July 1995	STS-70	
328	Mary Weber	United States	13 July 1995	STS-70	
330	Yuri Gidzenko	Russia	3 September 1995	Soyuz TM-22	
330	Thomas Reiter	Germany	3 September 1995	Soyuz TM-22	
332	Michael Gernhardt	United States	7 September 1995	STS-69	
333	Catherine Coleman	United States	20 October 1995	STS-73	
333	Frederick Leslie	United States	20 October 1995	STS-73	
333	Michael López-Alegría	United States	20 October 1995	STS-73	
333	Kent Rominger	United States	20 October 1995	STS-73	
333	Albert Sacco	United States	20 October 1995	STS-73	
338	Chris Hadfield	Canada	12 November 1995	STS-74	
339	Daniel Barry	United States	11 January 1996	STS-72	
339	Brent Jett	United States	11 January 1996	STS-72	
339	Winston Scott	United States	11 January 1996	STS-72	
339	Koichi Wakata	Japan	11 January 1996	STS-72	
343	Yury Onufriyenko	Russia	21 February 1996	Soyuz TM-23	
344	Maurizio Cheli	Italy	22 February 1996	STS-75	
344	Umberto Guidoni	Italy	22 February 1996	STS-75	
344	Scott Horowitz	United States	22 February 1996	STS-75	
347	Andrew Thomas	United States	19 May 1996	STS-77	
348	Charles Brady	United States	20 June 1996	STS-78	
348	Jean-Jacques Favier	France	20 June 1996	STS-78	
348	Richard Linnehan	United States	20 June 1996	STS-78	
348	Robert Thirsk	Canada	20 June 1996	STS-78	
352	Claudie Haigneré	France	17 August 1996	Soyuz TM-24	
352	Valery Korzun	Russia	17 August 1996	Soyuz TM-24	
354	Reinhold Ewald	Germany	10 February 1997	Soyuz TM-25	
354	Aleksandr Lazutkin	Russia	10 February 1997	Soyuz TM-25	
356	Roger Crouch	United States	4 April 1997	STS-83	
356	Gregory Linteris	United States	4 April 1997	STS-83	
356	Susan Kilrain	United States	4 April 1997	STS-83	
359	Edward Lu	United States	15 May 1997	STS-84	
359	Carlos Noriega	United States	15 May 1997	STS-84	
361	Pavel Vinogradov	Russia	5 August 1997	Soyuz TM-26	
362	Robert Curbeam	United States	7 August 1997	STS-85	
362	Stephen Robinson	United States	7 August 1997	STS-85	
362	Bjarni Tryggvason	Canada	7 August 1997	STS-85	
365	Michael Bloomfield	United States	26 September 1997	STS-86	
366	Kalpana Chawla †	United States	19 November 1997	STS-87	(Note: See the Space Shuttle Columbia disaster.)
366	Takao Doi	Japan	19 November 1997	STS-87	
366	Leonid Kadeniuk	Ukraine	19 November 1997	STS-87	
366	Steven Lindsey	United States	19 November 1997	STS-87	
370	Michael Anderson †	United States	23 January 1998	STS-89	
370	Joe Edwards	United States	23 January 1998	STS-89	
370	James Reilly	United States	23 January 1998	STS-89	
370	Salizhan Sharipov	Russia	23 January 1998	STS-89	
374	Léopold Eyharts	France	29 January 1998	Soyuz TM-27	
375	Scott Altman	United States	17 April 1998	STS-90	
375	Jay Buckey	United States	17 April 1998	STS-90	
375	Kathryn Hire	United States	17 April 1998	STS-90	
375	James Pawelczyk	United States	17 April 1998	STS-90	
375	Dafydd Williams	Canada	17 April 1998	STS-90	
380	Dominic Gorie	United States	2 June 1998	STS-91	
380	Janet Kavandi	United States	2 June 1998	STS-91	
382	Yuri Baturin	Russia	13 August 1998	Soyuz TM-28	
382	Gennady Padalka	Russia	13 August 1998	Soyuz TM-28	
384	Pedro Duque	Spain	29 October 1998	STS-95	
385	Frederick Sturckow	United States	4 December 1998	STS-88	
386	Ivan Bella	Slovakia	20 February 1999	Soyuz TM-29	
387	Rick Husband †	United States	27 May 1999	STS-96	
387	Julie Payette	Canada	27 May 1999	STS-96	
387	Valeri Tokarev	Russia	27 May 1999	STS-96	
390	Jeffrey Ashby	United States	23 July 1999	STS-93	
391	Scott Kelly	United States	20 December 1999	STS-103	
392	Gerhard Thiele	Germany	11 February 2000	STS-99	
393	Sergei Zalyotin	Russia	4 April 2000	Soyuz TM-30	
394	Jeffrey Williams	United States	19 May 2000	STS-101	
395	Daniel Burbank	United States	8 September 2000	STS-106	
395	Richard Mastracchio	United States	8 September 2000	STS-106	
395	Boris Morukov	Russia	8 September 2000	STS-106	
398	Pamela Melroy	United States	11 October 2000	STS-92	
399	Mark Polansky	United States	7 February 2001	STS-98	
400	James Kelly	United States	8 March 2001	STS-102	
400	Paul Richards	United States	8 March 2001	STS-102	
402	Yury Lonchakov	Russia	19 April 2001	STS-100	
402	John Phillips	United States	19 April 2001	STS-100	
404	Dennis Tito	United States	28 April 2001	Soyuz TM-32	
405	Charles Hobaugh	United States	12 July 2001	STS-104	
406	Patrick Forrester	United States	10 August 2001	STS-105	
406	Mikhail Tyurin	Russia	10 August 2001	STS-105	
408	Konstantin Kozeyev	Russia	21 October 2001	Soyuz TM-33	
409	Mark Kelly	United States	5 December 2001	STS-108	
409	Daniel Tani	United States	5 December 2001	STS-108	
411	Duane Carey	United States	1 March 2002	STS-109	
411	Michael Massimino	United States	1 March 2002	STS-109	
413	Stephen Frick	United States	8 April 2002	STS-110	
413	Lee Morin	United States	8 April 2002	STS-110	
413	Rex Walheim	United States	8 April 2002	STS-110	
416	Mark Shuttleworth	South Africa	25 April 2002	Soyuz TM-34	
416	Roberto Vittori	Italy	25 April 2002	Soyuz TM-34	
418	Paul Lockhart	United States	5 June 2002	STS-111	
418	Philippe Perrin	France	5 June 2002	STS-111	
418	Sergei Treshchov	Russia	5 June 2002	STS-111	
418	Peggy Whitson	United States	5 June 2002	STS-111	
422	Sandra Magnus	United States	7 October 2002	STS-112	
422	Piers Sellers	United States	7 October 2002	STS-112	(Note: Piers Sellers was a dual national of the United States and United Kingdom, but flew under the United States flag.)
422	Fyodor Yurchikhin	Russia	7 October 2002	STS-112	
425	Frank De Winne	Belgium	30 October 2002	Soyuz TMA-1	
426	John Herrington	United States	24 November 2002	STS-113	
426	Donald Pettit	United States	24 November 2002	STS-113	
428	David Brown ‡	United States	16 January 2003	STS-107	
428	Laurel Clark ‡	United States	16 January 2003	STS-107	
428	William McCool ‡	United States	16 January 2003	STS-107	
428	Ilan Ramon ‡	Israel	16 January 2003	STS-107	
432	Yang Liwei	China	15 October 2003	Shenzhou 5	
433	Edward Fincke	United States	19 April 2004	Soyuz TMA-4	
433	André Kuipers	Netherlands	19 April 2004	Soyuz TMA-4	
435	Michael Melvill	United States	21 June 2004	SpaceShipOne 15P	
436	Brian Binnie	United States	4 October 2004	SpaceShipOne 17P	
437	Yuri Shargin	Russia	14 October 2004	Soyuz TMA-5	
438	Charles Camarda	United States	26 July 2005	STS-114	
438	Soichi Noguchi	Japan	26 July 2005	STS-114	
440	Gregory Olsen	United States	1 October 2005	Soyuz TMA-7	
441	Fei Junlong	China	12 October 2005	Shenzhou 6	
441	Nie Haisheng	China	12 October 2005	Shenzhou 6	
443	Marcos Pontes	Brazil	30 March 2006	Soyuz TMA-8	
444	Michael Fossum	United States	4 July 2006	STS-121	
444	Lisa Nowak	United States	4 July 2006	STS-121	
444	Stephanie Wilson	United States	4 July 2006	STS-121	
447	Christopher Ferguson	United States	9 September 2006	STS-115	
447	Heidemarie Stefanyshyn-Piper	United States	9 September 2006	STS-115	
449	Anousheh Ansari	United States	18 September 2006	Soyuz TMA-9	(Note: Anousheh Ansari is a dual national of the United States and Iran, but flew under the United States flag.)
450	Christer Fuglesang	Sweden	10 December 2006	STS-116	
450	Joan Higginbotham	United States	10 December 2006	STS-116	
450	William Oefelein	United States	10 December 2006	STS-116	
450	Nicholas Patrick	United States	10 December 2006	STS-116	(Note: Nicholas Patrick is a dual national of the United States and United Kingdom, but flew under the United States flag.)
450	Sunita Williams	United States	10 December 2006	STS-116	
455	Oleg Kotov	Russia	7 April 2007	Soyuz TMA-10	
455	Charles Simonyi	United States	7 April 2007	Soyuz TMA-10	
457	Clayton Anderson	United States	8 June 2007	STS-117	
457	Lee Archambault	United States	8 June 2007	STS-117	
457	John Olivas	United States	8 June 2007	STS-117	
457	Steven Swanson	United States	8 June 2007	STS-117	
461	Tracy Caldwell Dyson	United States	8 August 2007	STS-118	
461	Benjamin Drew	United States	8 August 2007	STS-118	
461	Barbara Morgan	United States	8 August 2007	STS-118	
464	Sheikh Muszaphar Shukor	Malaysia	10 October 2007	Soyuz TMA-11	
465	Paolo Nespoli	Italy	23 October 2007	STS-120	
465	Douglas Wheelock	United States	23 October 2007	STS-120	
465	George Zamka	United States	23 October 2007	STS-120	
468	Stanley Love	United States	7 February 2008	STS-122	
468	Leland Melvin	United States	7 February 2008	STS-122	
468	Alan Poindexter	United States	7 February 2008	STS-122	
471	Robert Behnken	United States	11 March 2008	STS-123	
471	Michael Foreman	United States	11 March 2008	STS-123	
471	Gregory H. Johnson	United States	11 March 2008	STS-123	
471	Garrett Reisman	United States	11 March 2008	STS-123	
475	Oleg Kononenko	Russia	8 April 2008	Soyuz TMA-12	
475	Sergey Volkov	Russia	8 April 2008	Soyuz TMA-12	
475	Yi So-Yeon	South Korea	8 April 2008	Soyuz TMA-12	
478	Gregory Chamitoff	United States	31 May 2008	STS-124	
478	Ronald Garan	United States	31 May 2008	STS-124	
478	Kenneth Ham	United States	31 May 2008	STS-124	
478	Akihiko Hoshide	Japan	31 May 2008	STS-124	
478	Karen Nyberg	United States	31 May 2008	STS-124	
483	Jing Haipeng	China	25 September 2008	Shenzhou 7	
483	Liu Boming	China	25 September 2008	Shenzhou 7	
483	Zhai Zhigang	China	25 September 2008	Shenzhou 7	
486	Richard Garriott	United States	12 October 2008	Soyuz TMA-13	
487	Eric Boe	United States	15 November 2008	STS-126	
487	Stephen Bowen	United States	15 November 2008	STS-126	
487	Robert Kimbrough	United States	15 November 2008	STS-126	
490	Joseph Acaba	United States	15 March 2009	STS-119	
490	Dominic Antonelli	United States	15 March 2009	STS-119	
490	Richard Arnold	United States	15 March 2009	STS-119	
493	Michael Barratt	United States	26 March 2009	Soyuz TMA-14	
494	Andrew Feustel	United States	11 May 2009	STS-125	
494	Michael Good	United States	11 May 2009	STS-125	
494	Gregory C. Johnson	United States	11 May 2009	STS-125	
494	Megan McArthur	United States	11 May 2009	STS-125	
498	Roman Romanenko	Russia	27 May 2009	Soyuz TMA-15	
499	Christopher Cassidy	United States	15 July 2009	STS-127	
499	Douglas Hurley	United States	15 July 2009	STS-127	
499	Timothy Kopra	United States	15 July 2009	STS-127	
499	Thomas Marshburn	United States	15 July 2009	STS-127	
503	Kevin Ford	United States	29 August 2009	STS-128	
503	José M. Hernández	United States	29 August 2009	STS-128	
503	Nicole Stott	United States	29 August 2009	STS-128	
506	Guy Laliberté	Canada	30 September 2009	Soyuz TMA-16	
506	Maksim Surayev	Russia	30 September 2009	Soyuz TMA-16	
508	Randolph Bresnik	United States	12 November 2009	STS-129	
508	Robert Satcher	United States	12 November 2009	STS-129	
508	Barry Wilmore	United States	12 November 2009	STS-129	
511	Timothy Creamer	United States	20 December 2009	Soyuz TMA-17	
512	Terry Virts	United States	8 February 2010	STS-130	
513	Mikhail Korniyenko	Russia	2 April 2010	Soyuz TMA-18	
513	Aleksandr Skvortsov	Russia	2 April 2010	Soyuz TMA-18	
515	James Dutton	United States	5 April 2010	STS-131	
515	Dorothy Metcalf-Lindenburger	United States	5 April 2010	STS-131	
515	Naoko Yamazaki	Japan	5 April 2010	STS-131	
518	Shannon Walker	United States	15 June 2010	Soyuz TMA-19	
519	Oleg Skripochka	Russia	7 October 2010	Soyuz TMA-01M	
520	Dmitri Kondratyev	Russia	15 December 2010	Soyuz TMA-20	
521	Andrei Borisenko	Russia	4 April 2011	Soyuz TMA-21	
521	Aleksandr Samokutyayev	Russia	4 April 2011	Soyuz TMA-21	
523	Satoshi Furukawa	Japan	7 June 2011	Soyuz TMA-02M	
524	Anatoli Ivanishin	Russia	14 November 2011	Soyuz TMA-22	
524	Anton Shkaplerov	Russia	14 November 2011	Soyuz TMA-22	
526	Sergei Revin	Russia	15 May 2012	Soyuz TMA-04M	
527	Liu Wang	China	16 June 2012	Shenzhou 9	
527	Liu Yang	China	16 June 2012	Shenzhou 9	
529	Oleg Novitskiy	Russia	23 October 2012	Soyuz TMA-06M	
529	Evgeny Tarelkin	Russia	23 October 2012	Soyuz TMA-06M	
531	Alexander Misurkin	Russia	28 March 2013	Soyuz TMA-08M	
532	Luca Parmitano	Italy	28 May 2013	Soyuz TMA-09M	
533	Zhang Xiaoguang	China	11 June 2013	Shenzhou 10	
533	Wang Yaping	China	11 June 2013	Shenzhou 10	
535	Michael Hopkins	United States	25 September 2013	Soyuz TMA-10M	
535	Sergey Ryazansky	Russia	25 September 2013	Soyuz TMA-10M	
537	Oleg Artemyev	Russia	25 March 2014	Soyuz TMA-12M	
538	Reid Wiseman △	United States	28 May 2014	Soyuz TMA-13M	
538	Alexander Gerst	Germany	28 May 2014	Soyuz TMA-13M	
540	Yelena Serova	Russia	25 September 2014	Soyuz TMA-14M	
541	Samantha Cristoforetti	Italy	23 November 2014	Soyuz TMA-15M	
542	Kimiya Yui	Japan	22 July 2015	Soyuz TMA-17M	
542	Kjell N. Lindgren	United States	22 July 2015	Soyuz TMA-17M	
544	Andreas Mogensen	Denmark	2 September 2015	Soyuz TMA-18M	
544	Aidyn Aimbetov	Kazakhstan	2 September 2015	Soyuz TMA-18M	
546	Tim Peake	United Kingdom	15 December 2015	Soyuz TMA-19M	
547	Aleksey Ovchinin	Russia	18 March 2016	Soyuz TMA-20M	
548	Takuya Onishi	Japan	7 July 2016	Soyuz MS-01	
548	Kathleen Rubins	United States	7 July 2016	Soyuz MS-01	
550	Chen Dong	China	17 October 2016	Shenzhou 11	
551	Sergey Nikolayevich Ryzhikov	Russia	19 October 2016	Soyuz MS-02	
552	Thomas Pesquet	France	17 November 2016	Soyuz MS-03	
553	Jack Fischer	United States	20 April 2017	Soyuz MS-04	
554	Mark Vande Hei	United States	12 September 2017	Soyuz MS-06	
555	Norishige Kanai	Japan	17 December 2017	Soyuz MS-07	
555	Scott D. Tingle	United States	17 December 2017	Soyuz MS-07	
557	Sergey Prokopyev	Russia	6 June 2018	Soyuz MS-09	
557	Serena Auñón-Chancellor	United States	6 June 2018	Soyuz MS-09	
—	Nick Hague ⊗	United States	11 October 2018	Soyuz MS-10	(Note: Soyuz MS-10 booster failed several minutes after launch, and achieved sub-orbital spaceflight only according to the United States definition of 80 km (50 mi). The flight reached an altitude of 93 km (58 mi), not high enough to meet the official FAI criterion of 100 km (62 mi). The crew landed safely.)
559	David Saint-Jacques	Canada	3 December 2018	Soyuz MS-11	
559	Anne McClain	United States	3 December 2018	Soyuz MS-11	
561	Nick Hague	United States	14 March 2019	Soyuz MS-12	
561	Christina Koch △	United States	14 March 2019	Soyuz MS-12	
563	Andrew R. Morgan	United States	20 July 2019	Soyuz MS-13	
564	Jessica Meir	United States	25 September 2019	Soyuz MS-15	
564	Hazza Al Mansouri	United Arab Emirates	25 September 2019	Soyuz MS-15	
566	Ivan Vagner	Russia	9 April 2020	Soyuz MS-16	
567	Sergey Kud-Sverchkov	Russia	14 October 2020	Soyuz MS-17	
568	Victor Glover △	United States	15 November 2020	SpaceX Crew-1	
569	Pyotr Dubrov	Russia	9 April 2021	Soyuz MS-18	
570	Tang Hongbo	China	17 June 2021	Shenzhou 12	
571	Jeff Bezos	United States	20 July 2021	Blue Origin NS-16	
571	Wally Funk	United States	20 July 2021	Blue Origin NS-16	
571	Oliver Daemen	Netherlands	20 July 2021	Blue Origin NS-16	
571	Mark Bezos	United States	20 July 2021	Blue Origin NS-16	
575	Jared Isaacman	United States	15 September 2021	Inspiration4	
575	Sian Proctor	United States	15 September 2021	Inspiration4	
575	Hayley Arceneaux	United States	15 September 2021	Inspiration4	
575	Christopher Sembroski	United States	15 September 2021	Inspiration4	
579	Klim Shipenko	Russia	5 October 2021	Soyuz MS-19	
579	Yulia Peresild	Russia	5 October 2021	Soyuz MS-19	
581	Audrey Powers	United States	13 October 2021	Blue Origin NS-18	
581	Chris Boshuizen	Australia	13 October 2021	Blue Origin NS-18	
581	Glen de Vries	United States	13 October 2021	Blue Origin NS-18	
581	William Shatner	Canada	13 October 2021	Blue Origin NS-18	
585	Ye Guangfu	China	15 October 2021	Shenzhou 13	
586	Raja Chari	United States	11 November 2021	SpaceX Crew-3	
586	Kayla Barron	United States	11 November 2021	SpaceX Crew-3	
586	Matthias Maurer	Germany	11 November 2021	SpaceX Crew-3	
589	Yusaku Maezawa	Japan	8 December 2021	Soyuz MS-20	
589	Yozo Hirano	Japan	8 December 2021	Soyuz MS-20	
591	Laura Shepard Churchley	United States	11 December 2021	Blue Origin NS-19	
591	Michael Strahan	United States	11 December 2021	Blue Origin NS-19	
591	Dylan Taylor	United States	11 December 2021	Blue Origin NS-19	
591	Evan Dick	United States	11 December 2021	Blue Origin NS-19	
591	Lane Bess	United States	11 December 2021	Blue Origin NS-19	
591	Cameron Bess	United States	11 December 2021	Blue Origin NS-19	
597	Denis Matveev	Russia	18 March 2022	Soyuz MS-21	
597	Sergey Korsakov	Russia	18 March 2022	Soyuz MS-21	
599	Marty Allen	United States	31 March 2022	Blue Origin NS-20	
599	Sharon Hagle	United States	31 March 2022	Blue Origin NS-20	
599	Marc Hagle	United States	31 March 2022	Blue Origin NS-20	
599	Jim Kitchen	United States	31 March 2022	Blue Origin NS-20	
599	George Nield	United States	31 March 2022	Blue Origin NS-20	
599	Gary Lai	United States	31 March 2022	Blue Origin NS-20	
605	Larry Connor	United States	8 April 2022	Axiom Mission 1	
605	Mark Pathy	Canada	8 April 2022	Axiom Mission 1	
605	Eytan Stibbe	Israel	8 April 2022	Axiom Mission 1	
608	Robert Hines	United States	27 April 2022	SpaceX Crew-4	
608	Jessica Watkins	United States	27 April 2022	SpaceX Crew-4	
610	Katya Echazarreta	United States	4 June 2022	Blue Origin NS-21	
610	Hamish Harding	United Kingdom	4 June 2022	Blue Origin NS-21	
610	Victor Hespanha	Brazil	4 June 2022	Blue Origin NS-21	
610	Jaison Robinson	United States	4 June 2022	Blue Origin NS-21	
610	Victor Vescovo	United States	4 June 2022	Blue Origin NS-21	
615	Cai Xuzhe	China	5 June 2022	Shenzhou 14	
616	Coby Cotton	United States	4 August 2022	Blue Origin NS-22	(Note: Vanessa O'Brien is a dual national of the United States and the United Kingdom, but flew under the United Kingdom flag.)
616	Mário Ferreira	Portugal	4 August 2022	Blue Origin NS-22	(Note: Vanessa O'Brien is a dual national of the United States and the United Kingdom, but flew under the United Kingdom flag.)
616	Vanessa O'Brien	United Kingdom	4 August 2022	Blue Origin NS-22	(Note: Vanessa O'Brien is a dual national of the United States and the United Kingdom, but flew under the United Kingdom flag.)
616	Clint Kelly	United States	4 August 2022	Blue Origin NS-22	(Note: Vanessa O'Brien is a dual national of the United States and the United Kingdom, but flew under the United Kingdom flag.)
616	Sara Sabry	Egypt	4 August 2022	Blue Origin NS-22	(Note: Vanessa O'Brien is a dual national of the United States and the United Kingdom, but flew under the United Kingdom flag.)
616	Steve Young	United States	4 August 2022	Blue Origin NS-22	(Note: Vanessa O'Brien is a dual national of the United States and the United Kingdom, but flew under the United Kingdom flag.)
622	Dmitry Petelin	Russia	21 September 2022	Soyuz MS-22	
622	Francisco Rubio	United States	21 September 2022	Soyuz MS-22	
624	Nicole Aunapu Mann	United States	5 October 2022	SpaceX Crew-5	
624	Josh A. Cassada	United States	5 October 2022	SpaceX Crew-5	
624	Anna Kikina	Russia	5 October 2022	SpaceX Crew-5	
627	Deng Qingming	China	29 November 2022	Shenzhou 15	
627	Zhang Lu	China	29 November 2022	Shenzhou 15	
629	Warren Hoburg	United States	2 March 2023	SpaceX Crew-6	
629	Sultan Al Neyadi	United Arab Emirates	2 March 2023	SpaceX Crew-6	
629	Andrey Fedyaev	Russia	2 March 2023	SpaceX Crew-6	
632	John Shoffner	United States	21 May 2023	Axiom Mission 2	
632	Ali AlQarni	Saudi Arabia	21 May 2023	Axiom Mission 2	
632	Rayyanah Barnawi	Saudi Arabia	21 May 2023	Axiom Mission 2	
635	Zhu Yangzhu	China	30 May 2023	Shenzhou 16	
635	Gui Haichao	China	30 May 2023	Shenzhou 16	
637	Jasmin Moghbeli	United States	26 August 2023	SpaceX Crew-7	
637	Konstantin Borisov	Russia	26 August 2023	SpaceX Crew-7	
639	Nikolai Chub	Russia	15 September 2023	Soyuz MS-24	
639	Loral O'Hara	United States	15 September 2023	Soyuz MS-24	
641	Tang Shengjie	China	26 October 2023	Shenzhou 17	
641	Jiang Xinlin	China	26 October 2023	Shenzhou 17	
643	Alper Gezeravcı	Turkey	18 January 2024	Axiom Mission 3	
643	Walter Villadei	Italy	18 January 2024	Axiom Mission 3	
643	Marcus Wandt	Sweden	18 January 2024	Axiom Mission 3	
646	Matthew Dominick	United States	4 March 2024	SpaceX Crew-8	
646	Jeanette Epps	United States	4 March 2024	SpaceX Crew-8	
646	Alexander Grebenkin	Russia	4 March 2024	SpaceX Crew-8	
649	Marina Vasilevskaya	Belarus	23 March 2024	Soyuz MS-25	
650	Li Cong	China	25 April 2024	Shenzhou 18	
650	Li Guangsu	China	25 April 2024	Shenzhou 18	
652	Mason Angel	United States	19 May 2024	Blue Origin NS-25	
652	Sylvain Chiron	France	19 May 2024	Blue Origin NS-25	
652	Ed Dwight	United States	19 May 2024	Blue Origin NS-25	
652	Kenneth Hess	United States	19 May 2024	Blue Origin NS-25	
652	Carol Schaller	United States	19 May 2024	Blue Origin NS-25	
652	Gopichand Thotakura	India	19 May 2024	Blue Origin NS-25	
658	Nicolina Elrick	United Kingdom/Singapore	29 August 2024	Blue Origin NS-26	
658	Eugene Grin	Ukraine	29 August 2024	Blue Origin NS-26	
658	Rob Ferl	United States	29 August 2024	Blue Origin NS-26	
658	Eiman Jahangir	Iran/United States	29 August 2024	Blue Origin NS-26	
658	Karsen Kitchen	United States	29 August 2024	Blue Origin NS-26	
658	Ephraim Rabin	United States/Israel	29 August 2024	Blue Origin NS-26	
664	Scott Poteet	United States	10 September 2024	Polaris Dawn	
664	Sarah Gillis	United States	10 September 2024	Polaris Dawn	
664	Anna Menon	United States	10 September 2024	Polaris Dawn	
667	Aleksandr Gorbunov	Russia	28 September 2024	SpaceX Crew-9	
668	Song Lingdong	China	29 October 2024	Shenzhou 19	
668	Wang Haoze	China	29 October 2024	Shenzhou 19	
670	Austin Litteral	United States	22 November 2024	Blue Origin NS-28	
670	Emily Calandrelli	United States	22 November 2024	Blue Origin NS-28	
670	J. D. Russell	United States	22 November 2024	Blue Origin NS-28	
670	Henry Wolfond	Canada	22 November 2024	Blue Origin NS-28	
674	Richard Scott	United States	25 February 2025	Blue Origin NS-30	
674	Tushar Shah	United States	25 February 2025	Blue Origin NS-30	
674	Russell Wilson	United States	25 February 2025	Blue Origin NS-30	
674	Elaine Hyde	Australia	25 February 2025	Blue Origin NS-30	
674	Jesús Calleja	Spain	25 February 2025	Blue Origin NS-30	
679	Nichole Ayers	United States	14 March 2025	SpaceX Crew-10	
679	Kirill Peskov	Russia	14 March 2025	SpaceX Crew-10	
681	Chun Wang	Malta / Saint Kitts and Nevis (Note: Wang was born in China but lives primarily in Svalbard and since 2023 is also a citizen of Malta and Saint Kitts and Nevis through their golden visa programs. He will wear the flag of Malta on his spacesuit during the spaceflight.)	1 April 2025	Fram2	
681	Jannicke Mikkelsen	Norway / UK (Note: Mikkelsen was born in the United Kingdom, but is now a citizen of Norway. She will wear the flag of Norway on her spacesuit during the spaceflight.)	1 April 2025	Fram2	
681	Rabea Rogge	Germany	1 April 2025	Fram2	
681	Eric Philips	Australia	1 April 2025	Fram2	
685	Jonny Kim	United States	8 April 2025	Soyuz MS-27	
685	Alexey Zubritsky	Russia	8 April 2025	Soyuz MS-27	
687	Aisha Bowe	Bahamas / United States	14 April 2025	Blue Origin NS-31	
687	Amanda Nguyen	United States	14 April 2025	Blue Origin NS-31	
687	Gayle King	United States	14 April 2025	Blue Origin NS-31	
687	Katy Perry	United States	14 April 2025	Blue Origin NS-31	
687	Kerianne Flynn	United States	14 April 2025	Blue Origin NS-31	
687	Lauren Sánchez	United States	14 April 2025	Blue Origin NS-31	
693	Chen Zhongrui	China	24 April 2025	Shenzhou 20	
693	Wang Jie	China	24 April 2025	Shenzhou 20	
695	Mark Rocket	New Zealand	31 May 2025	Blue Origin NS-32	
695	Jaime Alemán	Panama	31 May 2025	Blue Origin NS-32	
695	Paul Jeris	United States	31 May 2025	Blue Origin NS-32	
695	Gretchen Green	United States	31 May 2025	Blue Origin NS-32	
695	Amy Medina Jorge	Puerto Rico	31 May 2025	Blue Origin NS-32	
695	Jesse Williams	Canada	31 May 2025	Blue Origin NS-32	
701	Shubhanshu Shukla	India	25 June 2025	Axiom Mission 4	
701	Tibor Kapu	Hungary	25 June 2025	Axiom Mission 4	
701	Sławosz Uznański-Wiśniewski	Poland	25 June 2025	Axiom Mission 4	
704	Owolabi Salis	Nigeria	29 June 2025	Blue Origin NS-33	
704	Allie Kuehner	United States	29 June 2025	Blue Origin NS-33	
704	Carl Kuehner	United States	29 June 2025	Blue Origin NS-33	
704	Leland Larson	United States	29 June 2025	Blue Origin NS-33	
704	Freddie Rescigno Jr.	United States	29 June 2025	Blue Origin NS-33	
704	Jim Sitkin	United States	29 June 2025	Blue Origin NS-33	
710	Zena Cardman	United States	1 August 2025	SpaceX Crew-11	
710	Oleg Platonov	Russia	1 August 2025	SpaceX Crew-11	
712	Lionel Pitchford	United Kingdom	3 August 2025	Blue Origin NS-34	
712	Gökhan Erdem	Turkey	3 August 2025	Blue Origin NS-34	
712	Arvinder Bahal	United States	3 August 2025	Blue Origin NS-34	
712	Justin Sun	Saint Kitts and Nevis	3 August 2025	Blue Origin NS-34	
712	Deborah Martorell	Puerto Rico	3 August 2025	Blue Origin NS-34	
717	Jeff Elgin	United States	8 October 2025	Blue Origin NS-36	
717	Aaron Newman	United States	8 October 2025	Blue Origin NS-36	
717	Vitalii Ostrovsky	Ukraine	8 October 2025	Blue Origin NS-36	
717	Danna Karagussova	Kazakhstan	8 October 2025	Blue Origin NS-36	
717	William H. Lewis	United States	8 October 2025	Blue Origin NS-36	
722	Wu Fei	China	31 October 2025	Shenzhou 21	
722	Zhang Hongzhang	China	31 October 2025	Shenzhou 21	
724	Sergey Mikayev	Russia	27 November 2025	Soyuz MS-28	
724	Christopher Williams	United States	27 November 2025	Soyuz MS-28	
726	Joey Hyde	United States	20 December 2025	Blue Origin NS-37	
726	Hans Koenigsmann	United States / Germany	20 December 2025	Blue Origin NS-37	
726	Michaela "Michi" Benthaus	Germany	20 December 2025	Blue Origin NS-37	
726	Neal Milch	United States	20 December 2025	Blue Origin NS-37	
726	Adonis Pouroulis	South Africa	20 December 2025	Blue Origin NS-37	
726	Jason Stansell	United States	20 December 2025	Blue Origin NS-37	
732	Tim Drexler	United States	22 January 2026	Blue Origin NS-38	
732	Linda Edwards	United States	22 January 2026	Blue Origin NS-38	
732	Alain Fernandez	France	22 January 2026	Blue Origin NS-38	
732	Alberto Gutiérrez	Spain	22 January 2026	Blue Origin NS-38	
732	Jim Hendren	United States	22 January 2026	Blue Origin NS-38	
732	Laura Stiles	United States	22 January 2026	Blue Origin NS-38	
738	Jack Hathaway	United States	13 February 2026	SpaceX Crew-12	
738	Sophie Adenot	France	13 February 2026	SpaceX Crew-12	
740	Jeremy Hansen △	Canada	1 April 2026	Artemis II	
741	Zhang Zhiyuan	China	24 May 2026	Shenzhou 23	
741	Lai Ka-ying	Hong Kong	24 May 2026	Shenzhou 23	
743	Anil Menon	United States	14 July 2026	Soyuz MS-29	
744	Luke Delaney	United States	1 October 2026	SpaceX Crew-13	
744	Joshua Kutryk	Canada	1 October 2026	SpaceX Crew-13	
744	Sergey Teteryatnikov	Russia	1 October 2026	SpaceX Crew-13	

== See also ==
- Human spaceflight
- List of astronauts by name
- List of astronauts by nationality
- List of fully civilian crewed suborbital spaceflights
- List of fully civilian crewed orbital spaceflights
- List of space travelers by name
- Spaceflight records
- Timeline of space travel by nationality
