= List of R-7 launches (1965–1969) =

This is a list of launches made by the R-7 Semyorka ICBM, and its derivatives between 1965 and 1969. All launches are orbital satellite launches, unless stated otherwise.

Date and time (GMT)	Configuration	Serial number	Launch site	Result	Payload	Remarks
== 1965 ==
11 January 1965, 09:36	Vostok-2 (8A92)	R15002-03	LC-31/6, Baikonur	Successful	Kosmos 52 (Zenit-2)	
22 February 1965, 07:40:48	Voskhod (11A57)	R15000-03	LC-31/6, Baikonur	Successful	Kosmos 57 (Voskhod)	
26 February 1965, 05:02	Vostok-2M (8A92M)	R15000-09	LC-31/6, Baikonur	Successful	Kosmos 58 (Meteor)	
7 March 1965, 09:07	Voskhod (11A57)	R15001-05	LC-31/6, Baikonur	Successful	Kosmos 59 (Zenit-4)	
12 March 1965, 09:30	Molniya (8K78)	R103-25	LC-1/5, Baikonur	Failure	Kosmos 60 (Luna)	Blok L engine failed to start due to a malfunction of the guidance system
18 March 1965, 07:00:00	Voskhod (11A57)	R15000-05	LC-1/5, Baikonur	Successful	Voskhod 2	Crewed orbital flight, 2 cosmonauts First EVA
25 March 1965, 10:04	Vostok-2 (8A92)	G15001-06	LC-31/6, Baikonur	Successful	Kosmos 64 (Zenit-2)	
10 April 1965, 08:39	Molniya (8K78)	R103-26	LC-1/5, Baikonur	Failure	Luna 1965A	Blok I pressurization failure results in low thrust. Automatic shutdown commanded.
17 April 1965, 09:50	Voskhod (11A57)	G15000-11	LC-31/6, Baikonur	Successful	Kosmos 65 (Zenit-4)	
23 April 1965, 01:55	Molniya (8K78)	U103-35	LC-1/5, Baikonur	Successful	Molniya-1-01	
7 May 1965, 09:50	Vostok-2 (8A92)	R15002-04	LC-31/6, Baikonur	Successful	Kosmos 66 (Zenit-2)	
9 May 1965, 07:49	Molniya (8K78)	U103-30	LC-1/5, Baikonur	Successful	Luna 5	
25 May 1965, 10:58	Voskhod (11A57)	R15001-04	LC-31/6, Baikonur	Successful	Kosmos 67 (Zenit-4)	
8 June 1965, 07:40	Molniya (8K78)	U103-31	LC-1/5, Baikonur	Successful	Luna 6	
15 June 1965, 10:04	Vostok-2 (8A92)	U15001-01	LC-31/6, Baikonur	Successful	Kosmos 68 (Zenit-2)	
25 June 1965, 09:50	Voskhod (11A57)	G15000-10	LC-1/5, Baikonur	Successful	Kosmos 69 (Zenit-4)	
13 July 1965, 11:00	Vostok-2 (8A92)	R15002-05	LC-31/6, Baikonur	Failure	Zenit-2	Blok A pitch control failure
18 July 1965, 14:38	Molniya (8K78)		LC-1/5, Baikonur	Successful	Zond 3	
3 August 1965, 11:02	Voskhod (11A57)	U15001-01	LC-31/6, Baikonur	Successful	Kosmos 77 (Zenit-4)	
14 August 1965, 11:16	Vostok-2 (8A92)	U15001-02	LC-31/6, Baikonur	Successful	Kosmos 78 (Zenit-2)	
25 August 1965, 10:09	Voskhod (11A57)	R15001-06	LC-1/5, Baikonur	Successful	Kosmos 79 (Zenit-4)	
9 September 1965, 09:36	Voskhod (11A57)	R15001-02	LC-31/6, Baikonur	Successful	Kosmos 85 (Zenit-4)	
23 September 1965, 09:07	Voskhod (11A57)	R15001-03	LC-31/6, Baikonur	Successful	Kosmos 91 (Zenit-4)	
4 October 1965, 07:56	Molniya-M (8K78M)	U103-27	LC-1/5, Baikonur	Successful	Luna 7	Maiden flight of Molniya 8K78M
14 October 1965, 19:40	Molniya (8K78)	U103-37	LC-1/5, Baikonur	Successful	Molniya-1-02	
16 October 1965, 08:09	Voskhod (11A57)	U15001-04	LC-31/6, Baikonur	Successful	Kosmos 92 (Zenit-4)	
28 October 1965, 08:24	Voskhod (11A57)	U15001-03	LC-31/6, Baikonur	Successful	Kosmos 94 (Zenit-4)	
12 November 1965, 05:02	Molniya (8K78)		LC-31/6, Baikonur	Successful	Venera 2	
16 November 1965, 04:19	Molniya (8K78)		LC-31/6, Baikonur	Successful	Venera 3	
23 November 1965, 03:21	Molniya (8K78)		LC-31/6, Baikonur	Failure	Kosmos 96 (Venera)	Blok I engine exploded T+528 seconds from a fuel leak. The Blok L reached orbit but could not be stabilized for restart.
27 November 1965, 08:24	Vostok-2 (8A92)	U15001-05	LC-31/6, Baikonur	Successful	Kosmos 98 (Zenit-2)	
3 December 1965, 10:46	Molniya (8K78)	U103-28	LC-31/6, Baikonur	Successful	Luna 8	
10 December 1965, 08:09	Vostok-2 (8A92)	U15001-04	LC-31/6, Baikonur	Successful	Kosmos 99 (Zenit-2)	
14 December 1965, 11:18	R-7A Semyorka (8K74)		LC-41/1, Plesetsk	Successful	N/A	ICBM test First R-7 launch from Plesetsk
17 December 1965, 02:24	Vostok-2M (8A92M)	R15000-31	LC-31/6, Baikonur	Successful	Kosmos 100 (Meteor)	
21 December 1965, 20:03	R-7A Semyorka (8K74)		LC-43/3, Plesetsk	Successful	N/A	ICBM test First launch from Site 43/3
27 December 1965, 22:19	Soyuz/Vostok (11A510)	G15000-01	LC-31/6, Baikonur	Successful	Kosmos 102 (US-A)	Maiden flight of Soyuz/Vostok 11A510
== 1966 ==
7 January 1966, 08:24	Vostok-2 (8A92)		LC-31/6, Baikonur	Successful	Kosmos 104 (Zenit-2)	
22 January 1966, 08:38	Vostok-2 (8A92)		LC-31/6, Baikonur	Successful	Kosmos 105 (Zenit-2)	
31 January 1966, 11:41:37	Molniya-M (8K78M)	U103-32	LC-31/6, Baikonur	Successful	Luna 9	
10 February 1966, 08:52	Vostok-2 (8A92)		LC-31/6, Baikonur	Successful	Kosmos 107 (Zenit-2)	
19 February 1966, 08:52	Voskhod (11A57)		LC-31/6, Baikonur	Successful	Kosmos 109 (Zenit-4)	
22 February 1966, 20:09	Voskhod (11A57)	R15000-06	LC-31/6, Baikonur	Successful	Kosmos 110 (Voskhod)	
1 March 1966, 11:03:49	Molniya-M (8K78M)	N103-41	LC-31/6, Baikonur	Failure	Kosmos 111 (Luna)	Blok L roll control failure prevents restart in orbit
17 March 1966, 10:28	Vostok-2 (8A92)		LC-41/1, Plesetsk	Successful	Kosmos 112 (Zenit-2)	
21 March 1966, 09:36	Voskhod (11A57)		LC-31/6, Baikonur	Successful	Kosmos 113 (Zenit-4)	
27 March 1966, 07:20	Molniya (8K78)	N103-38	LC-31/6, Baikonur	Failure	Molniya-1	Blok I flight control failure T+299 seconds
31 March 1966, 10:47	Molniya-M (8K78M)	N103-42	LC-31/6, Baikonur	Successful	Luna 10	
6 April 1966, 11:40	Voskhod (11A57)	U15001-02	LC-41/1, Plesetsk	Successful	Kosmos 114 (Zenit-4)	
20 April 1966, 10:48	Vostok-2 (8A92)		LC-31/6, Baikonur	Successful	Kosmos 115 (Zenit-2)	
25 April 1966, 07:12	Molniya (8K78)	N103-39	LC-31/6, Baikonur	Successful	Molniya-1-03	
6 May 1966, 11:02	Vostok-2 (8A92)	N15001-01	LC-31/6, Baikonur	Successful	Kosmos 117 (Zenit-2)	
11 May 1966, 14:09	Vostok-2M (8A92M)		LC-31/6, Baikonur	Successful	Kosmos 118 (Meteor)	
17 May 1966, 11:00	Voskhod (11A57)		LC-41/1, Plesetsk	Failure	Zenit-4	Blok G strap-on lost thrust due to a turbopump gearbox failure and broke off the stack at T+96 seconds
27 May 1966	R-7A Semyorka (8K74)		LC-1/5, Baikonur	Successful	N/A	ICBM test
8 June 1966, 11:02	Voskhod (11A57)		LC-31/6, Baikonur	Successful	Kosmos 120 (Zenit-2)	
17 June 1966, 11:00	Voskhod (11A57)		LC-41/1, Plesetsk	Successful	Kosmos 121 (Zenit-4)	
25 June 1966, 10:30	Vostok-2M (8A92M)	N15000-21	LC-31/6, Baikonur	Successful	Kosmos 122 (Meteor)	
25 June 1966	R-7A Semyorka (8K74)		LC-1/5, Baikonur	Successful	N/A	ICBM test
14 July 1966, 10:33	Voskhod (11A57)	N15001-14	LC-31/6, Baikonur	Successful	Kosmos 124 (Zenit-2)	
20 July 1966, 09:07	Soyuz/Vostok (11A510)	G15000-02	LC-31/6, Baikonur	Successful	Kosmos 125 (US-A)	Final flight of Soyuz/Vostok 11A510
28 July 1966, 10:48	Voskhod (11A57)	N15001-01	LC-31/6, Baikonur	Successful	Kosmos 126 (Zenit-4)	
8 August 1966, 11:16	Voskhod (11A57)	N15001-13	LC-31/6, Baikonur	Successful	Kosmos 127 (Zenit-4)	
24 August 1966, 08:03	Molniya-M (8K78M)	N103-43	LC-31/6, Baikonur	Successful	Luna 11	
27 August 1966, 09:50	Voskhod (11A57)	N15001-03	LC-1/5, Baikonur	Successful	Kosmos 128 (Zenit-4)	
16 September 1966, 09:30	Vostok-2 (8A92)		LC-31/6, Baikonur	Failure	Zenit-2	Blok D strap-on LOX regulator failure
14 October 1966, 12:13:08	Vostok-2 (8A92)		LC-41/1, Plesetsk	Successful	Kosmos 129 (Zenit-2)	
20 October 1966, 07:55	Molniya (8K78)	N103-40	LC-1/5, Baikonur	Successful	Molniya-1-04	
20 October 1966, 08:52	Voskhod (11A57)	N15001-04	LC-31/6, Baikonur	Successful	Kosmos 130 (Zenit-4)	
22 October 1966, 08:42	Molniya-M (8K78M)	N103-44	LC-31/6, Baikonur	Successful	Luna 12	
12 November 1966, 09:50	Voskhod (11A57)		LC-41/1, Plesetsk	Successful	Kosmos 131 (Zenit-4)	
19 November 1966, 08:09	Vostok-2 (8A92)	N15001-08	LC-31/6, Baikonur	Successful	Kosmos 132 (Zenit-2)	
28 November 1966, 11:00	Soyuz (11A511)	U15000-02	LC-31/6, Baikonur	Successful	Kosmos 133 (Soyuz 7K-OK)	Maiden flight of Soyuz 11A511
3 December 1966, 08:09	Voskhod (11A57)	N15001-06	LC-31/6, Baikonur	Successful	Kosmos 134 (Zenit-4)	
14 December 1966, 11:00	Soyuz (11A511)	U15000-01	LC-31/6, Baikonur	Failure	Soyuz 7K-OK	Launch aborted after core ignition when boosters failed to fire Launch escape system erroneously fired during safing, igniting third stage propellent Rocket exploded on launch pad, resulting in one fatality
19 December 1966, 12:00:01	Vostok-2 (8A92)		LC-41/1, Plesetsk	Successful	Kosmos 136 (Zenit-2)	
21 December 1966, 10:17	Molniya-M (8K78M)	N103-45	LC-1/5, Baikonur	Successful	Luna 13	
== 1967 ==
19 January 1967, 12:39:59	Vostok-2 (8A92)		LC-41/1, Plesetsk	Successful	Kosmos 138 (Zenit-2)	
7 February 1967, 03:20:00	Soyuz (11A511)	U15000-03	LC-1/5, Baikonur	Successful	Kosmos 140 (Soyuz 7K-OK)	
8 February 1967, 10:19	Voskhod (11A57)		LC-41/1, Plesetsk	Successful	Kosmos 141 (Zenit-4)	
27 February 1967, 08:45:01	Vostok-2 (8A92)	U15001-03	LC-1/5, Baikonur	Successful	Kosmos 143 (Zenit-2)	
28 February 1967, 14:34:59	Vostok-2M (8A92M)		LC-41/1, Plesetsk	Successful	Kosmos 144 (Meteor)	
13 March 1967, 12:10:23	Vostok-2 (8A92)		LC-41/1, Plesetsk	Successful	Kosmos 147 (Zenit-2)	
22 March 1967, 12:44:59	Voskhod (11A57)		LC-41/1, Plesetsk	Successful	Kosmos 150 (Zenit-4)	
4 April 1967, 14:00	Vostok-2 (8A92)		LC-41/1, Plesetsk	Successful	Kosmos 153 (Zenit-2)	
12 April 1967, 10:51:02	Voskhod (11A57)	N15001-08	LC-1/5, Baikonur	Successful	Kosmos 155 (Zenit-4)	
23 April 1967, 00:35:00	Soyuz (11A511)	U15000-04	LC-1/5, Baikonur	Successful	Soyuz 1	Crewed orbital flight, 1 cosmonaut, Vladimir Komarov; Parachute failure during descent resulted in loss of crew
27 April 1967, 12:50	Vostok-2M (8A92M)		LC-41/1, Plesetsk	Successful	Kosmos 156 (Meteor)	
12 May 1967, 10:30:01	Vostok-2 (8A92)		LC-1/5, Baikonur	Successful	Kosmos 157 (Zenit-2)	Final flight of Vostok-2 8A92
16 May 1967, 21:43:57	Molniya-M (8K78M)	Ya716-56	LC-1/5, Baikonur	Partial failure	Kosmos 159 (Luna)	Premature Blok L cutoff
22 May 1967, 14:00	Voskhod (11A57)		LC-41/1, Plesetsk	Successful	Kosmos 161 (Zenit-4)	
24 May 1967, 22:50	Molniya (8K78)		LC-1/5, Baikonur	Successful	Molniya-1-05	
1 June 1967, 10:40	Voskhod (11A57)	Ya15001-11	LC-1/5, Baikonur	Successful	Kosmos 162 (Zenit-4)	
8 June 1967, 13:00:01	Voskhod (11A57)	Ya15001-13	LC-41/1, Plesetsk	Successful	Kosmos 164 (Zenit-2)	
12 June 1967, 02:39:45	Molniya-M (8K78M)		LC-1/5, Baikonur	Successful	Venera 4	
17 June 1967, 02:36:38	Molniya-M (8K78M)		LC-1/5, Baikonur	Failure	Kosmos 167 (Venera)	Blok L failed to start due to improper preflight procedure
20 June 1967, 11:00	Voskhod (11A57)		LC-41/1, Plesetsk	Failure	Zenit-4	Improper separation of Blok D strap-on at staging led to it colliding with the Blok A core stage and rupturing its RP-1 tank. Launcher exploded when leaking propellant came into contact with the engine exhaust.
4 July 1967, 05:59:59	Voskhod (11A57)	Ya15001-05	LC-31/6, Baikonur	Successful	Kosmos 168 (Zenit-2)	
21 July 1967, 06:00	Voskhod (11A57)	Ya15001-14	LC-31/6, Baikonur	Failure	Zenit-4	Blok I shut down prematurely at T+482 seconds due to LOX depletion caused by racing regulator
25 July 1967, 08:00	R-7A Semyorka (8K74)		LC-43/4, Plesetsk	Successful	N/A	ICBM test Final flight of R-7A Semyorka 8K74; Final flight of an R-7 as an ICBM; First launch from Site 43/4
9 August 1967, 05:45	Voskhod (11A57)		LC-1/5, Baikonur	Successful	Kosmos 172 (Zenit-4)	
31 August 1967, 08:00	Molniya (8K78)		LC-1/5, Baikonur	Successful	Kosmos 174 (Molniya)	
1 September 1967, 10:30	Voskhod (11A57)		LC-41/1, Plesetsk	Failure	Zenit-2	Accidental cutoff command sent to Blok I at T+295 seconds
11 September 1967, 10:30	Voskhod (11A57)		LC-41/1, Plesetsk	Successful	Kosmos 175 (Zenit-4)	
16 September 1967, 06:06:00	Voskhod (11A57)		LC-1/5, Baikonur	Successful	Kosmos 177 (Zenit-2)	
26 September 1967, 10:20	Voskhod (11A57)		LC-41/1, Plesetsk	Successful	Kosmos 180 (Zenit-2)	
3 October 1967, 05:00	Molniya (8K78)		LC-1/5, Baikonur	Successful	Molniya-1-06	
11 October 1967, 11:30:04	Voskhod (11A57)		LC-41/1, Plesetsk	Successful	Kosmos 181 (Zenit-2)	
16 October 1967, 08:00	Voskhod (11A57)		LC-1/5, Baikonur	Successful	Kosmos 182 (Zenit-4)	
22 October 1967, 08:40	Molniya (8K78)		LC-1/5, Baikonur	Successful	Molniya-1-07	Final flight of Molniya 8K78
24 October 1967, 22:49:09	Vostok-2M (8A92M)		LC-41/1, Plesetsk	Successful	Kosmos 184 (Meteor)	
27 October 1967, 09:29:59	Soyuz (11A511)		LC-31/6, Baikonur	Successful	Kosmos 186 (Soyuz 7K-OK)	
30 October 1967, 08:12:41	Soyuz (11A511)		LC-1/5, Baikonur	Successful	Kosmos 188 (Soyuz 7K-OK)	
3 November 1967, 11:20	Voskhod (11A57)		LC-41/1, Plesetsk	Successful	Kosmos 190 (Zenit-4)	
25 November 1967, 11:30	Voskhod (11A57)		LC-41/1, Plesetsk	Successful	Kosmos 193 (Zenit-2)	
3 December 1967, 12:00	Voskhod (11A57)		LC-41/1, Plesetsk	Successful	Kosmos 194 (Zenit-4)	
16 December 1967, 12:00:37	Voskhod (11A57)		LC-41/1, Plesetsk	Successful	Kosmos 195 (Zenit-2)	Spacecraft failed to separate from carrier rocket, did not preclude successful mission
== 1968 ==
16 January 1968, 12:00	Voskhod (11A57)		LC-41/1, Plesetsk	Successful	Kosmos 199 (Zenit-2)	
6 February 1968, 08:00	Voskhod (11A57)		LC-31/6, Baikonur	Successful	Kosmos 201 (Zenit-4)	
7 February 1968, 10:43	Molniya-M (8K78M)		LC-1/5, Baikonur	Failure	Luna E-6LS No.112	Stage 3's engine 11D55 cut off prematurely at T+524.6 sec because it ran out of fuel due to an excessive fuel consumption rate through a blocked gas-generator.
5 March 1968, 12:30	Voskhod (11A57)		LC-41/1, Plesetsk	Successful	Kosmos 205 (Zenit-2)	
14 March 1968, 09:34	Vostok-2M (8A92M)		LC-41/1, Plesetsk	Successful	Kosmos 206 (Meteor)	
16 March 1968, 12:30	Voskhod (11A57)		LC-41/1, Plesetsk	Successful	Kosmos 207 (Zenit-4)	
21 March 1968, 09:50	Voskhod (11A57)		LC-1/5, Baikonur	Successful	Kosmos 208 (Zenit-2M)	
3 April 1968, 11:00	Voskhod (11A57)		LC-41/1, Plesetsk	Successful	Kosmos 210 (Zenit-2)	
7 April 1968, 10:09	Molniya-M (8K78M)		LC-1/5, Baikonur	Successful	Luna 14	
14 April 1968, 10:00	Soyuz (11A511)		LC-31/6, Baikonur	Successful	Kosmos 212 (Soyuz 7K-OK)	
15 April 1968, 06:34	Soyuz (11A511)		LC-1/5, Baikonur	Successful	Kosmos 213 (Soyuz 7K-OK)	
18 April 1968, 10:30	Voskhod (11A57)		LC-41/1, Plesetsk	Successful	Kosmos 214 (Zenit-4)	
20 April 1968, 10:30	Voskhod (11A57)		LC-31/6, Baikonur	Successful	Kosmos 216 (Zenit-2)	
21 April 1968, 04:20	Molniya-M (8K78M)		LC-1/5, Baikonur	Successful	Molniya-1-08	
1 June 1968, 10:50	Voskhod (11A57)		LC-41/1, Plesetsk	Successful	Kosmos 223 (Zenit-2)	
4 June 1968, 06:45	Voskhod (11A57)		LC-31/6, Baikonur	Successful	Kosmos 224 (Zenit-4)	
12 June 1968, 13:14	Vostok-2M (8A92M)		LC-41/1, Plesetsk	Successful	Kosmos 226 (Meteor)	
18 June 1968, 06:15	Voskhod (11A57)		LC-31/6, Baikonur	Successful	Kosmos 227 (Zenit-4)	
21 June 1968, 12:00	Voskhod (11A57)		LC-1/5, Baikonur	Successful	Kosmos 228 (Zenit-2M)	
26 June 1968, 11:00	Voskhod (11A57)		LC-41/1, Plesetsk	Successful	Kosmos 229 (Zenit-4)	
5 July 1968, 15:25	Molniya-M (8K78M)		LC-1/5, Baikonur	Successful	Molniya-1-09	
10 July 1968, 19:49	Voskhod (11A57)		LC-31/6, Baikonur	Successful	Kosmos 231 (Zenit-2)	
16 July 1968, 13:10	Voskhod (11A57)		LC-41/1, Plesetsk	Successful	Kosmos 232 (Zenit-4)	
30 July 1968, 07:00	Voskhod (11A57)		LC-31/6, Baikonur	Successful	Kosmos 234 (Zenit-4)	
9 August 1968, 07:00	Voskhod (11A57)		LC-31/6, Baikonur	Successful	Kosmos 235 (Zenit-2)	
27 August 1968, 12:29	Voskhod (11A57)		LC-41/1, Plesetsk	Successful	Kosmos 237 (Zenit-4)	
28 August 1968, 10:00	Soyuz (11A511)		LC-31/6, Baikonur	Successful	Kosmos 238 (Soyuz 7K-OK)	
5 September 1968, 07:00	Voskhod (11A57)		LC-31/6, Baikonur	Successful	Kosmos 239 (Zenit-4)	
14 September 1968, 06:50	Voskhod (11A57)		LC-31/6, Baikonur	Successful	Kosmos 240 (Zenit-2)	
16 September 1968, 12:30	Voskhod (11A57)		LC-41/1, Plesetsk	Successful	Kosmos 241 (Zenit-4)	
23 September 1968, 07:39	Voskhod (11A57)		LC-1/5, Baikonur	Successful	Kosmos 243 (Zenit-2M)	
5 October 1968, 00:32	Molniya-M (8K78M)		LC-1/5, Baikonur	Successful	Molniya-1-10	
7 October 1968, 12:05	Voskhod (11A57)		LC-41/1, Plesetsk	Successful	Kosmos 246 (Zenit-4)	
11 October 1968, 12:05	Voskhod (11A57)		LC-41/1, Plesetsk	Successful	Kosmos 247 (Zenit-2)	
25 October 1968, 09:00	Soyuz (11A511)		LC-1/5, Baikonur	Successful	Soyuz 2	Uncrewed, docking target for Soyuz 3
26 October 1968, 08:34	Soyuz (11A511)		LC-31/6, Baikonur	Successful	Soyuz 3	Crewed orbital flight, 1 cosmonaut, Georgi Beregovoi; Failed to dock with Soyuz 2
31 October 1968, 09:14	Voskhod (11A57)		LC-1/5, Baikonur	Successful	Kosmos 251 (Zenit-4M)	
13 November 1968, 12:00	Voskhod (11A57)		LC-41/1, Plesetsk	Successful	Kosmos 253 (Zenit-2)	
21 November 1968, 12:10	Voskhod (11A57)		LC-41/1, Plesetsk	Successful	Kosmos 254 (Zenit-4)	
29 November 1968, 12:40	Voskhod (11A57)		LC-41/1, Plesetsk	Successful	Kosmos 255 (Zenit-2)	
10 December 1968, 08:25	Voskhod (11A57)		LC-31/6, Baikonur	Successful	Kosmos 258 (Zenit-2)	
16 December 1968, 09:15	Molniya-M (8K78M)		LC-1/5, Baikonur	Successful	Kosmos 260 (Molniya-1)	
== 1969 ==
5 January 1969, 06:28	Molniya-M (8K78M)		LC-1/5, Baikonur	Successful	Venera 5	
10 January 1969, 05:51	Molniya-M (8K78M)		LC-1/5, Baikonur	Successful	Venera 6	
12 January 1969, 12:10	Voskhod (11A57)		LC-41/1, Plesetsk	Successful	Kosmos 263 (Zenit-2)	
14 January 1969, 07:30	Soyuz (11A511)		LC-31/6, Baikonur	Successful	Soyuz 4	Crewed orbital flight, 1 cosmonaut, Vladimir Shatalov; First spacecraft to dock with another in space (Soyuz 5), and transfer of crew
15 January 1969, 07:04	Soyuz (11A511)		LC-1/5, Baikonur	Successful	Soyuz 5	Crewed orbital flight, 2 cosmonauts Docked with Soyuz 4 and transferred crew
23 January 1969, 09:15	Voskhod (11A57)		LC-1/5, Baikonur	Successful	Kosmos 264 (Zenit-4M)	
1 February 1969, 12:11	Vostok-2M (8A92M)		LC-41/1, Plesetsk	Failure	Meteor	Blok A lost thrust. Automatic shutdown commanded T+258 seconds.
25 February 1969, 10:20	Voskhod (11A57)		LC-41/1, Plesetsk	Successful	Kosmos 266 (Zenit-2)	
26 February 1969, 08:30	Voskhod (11A57)		LC-31/6, Baikonur	Successful	Kosmos 267 (Zenit-4)	
6 March 1969, 12:15	Voskhod (11A57)		LC-41/1, Plesetsk	Successful	Kosmos 270 (Zenit-4)	
15 March 1969, 12:15	Voskhod (11A57)		LC-41/1, Plesetsk	Successful	Kosmos 271 (Zenit-4)	
22 March 1969, 12:15	Voskhod (11A57)		LC-41/1, Plesetsk	Successful	Kosmos 273 (Zenit-2)	
24 March 1969, 10:10	Voskhod (11A57)		LC-31/6, Baikonur	Successful	Kosmos 274 (Zenit-4)	
26 March 1969, 12:30	Vostok-2M (8A92M)		LC-41/1, Plesetsk	Successful	Meteor-1-1	
4 April 1969, 10:20	Voskhod (11A57)		LC-41/1, Plesetsk	Successful	Kosmos 276 (Zenit-4)	
9 April 1969, 13:00	Voskhod (11A57)		LC-41/1, Plesetsk	Successful	Kosmos 278 (Zenit-2)	
11 April 1969, 02:30	Molniya-M (8K78M)		LC-1/5, Baikonur	Successful	Molniya-1-11	
15 April 1969, 08:14	Voskhod (11A57)		LC-1/5, Baikonur	Successful	Kosmos 279 (Zenit-4)	
23 April 1969, 09:55	Voskhod (11A57)		LC-1/5, Baikonur	Successful	Kosmos 280 (Zenit-4M)	
13 May 1969, 09:15	Voskhod (11A57)		LC-41/1, Plesetsk	Successful	Kosmos 281 (Zenit-2)	
20 May 1969, 08:40	Voskhod (11A57)		LC-41/1, Plesetsk	Successful	Kosmos 282 (Zenit-4)	
29 May 1969, 06:59	Voskhod (11A57)		LC-31/6, Baikonur	Successful	Kosmos 284 (Zenit-4)	
15 June 1969, 08:59	Voskhod (11A57)		LC-41/1, Plesetsk	Successful	Kosmos 286 (Zenit-4)	
24 June 1969, 06:50	Voskhod (11A57)		LC-31/6, Baikonur	Successful	Kosmos 287 (Zenit-2)	
27 June 1969, 06:59	Voskhod (11A57)		LC-1/5, Baikonur	Successful	Kosmos 288 (Zenit-4)	
10 July 1969, 09:00	Voskhod (11A57)		LC-41/1, Plesetsk	Successful	Kosmos 289 (Zenit-4)	
22 July 1969, 12:30	Voskhod (11A57)		LC-41/1, Plesetsk	Successful	Kosmos 290 (Zenit-2)	
22 July 1969, 12:55	Molniya-M (8K78M)		LC-1/5, Baikonur	Successful	Molniya-1-12	
16 August 1969, 11:59	Voskhod (11A57)		LC-31/6, Baikonur	Successful	Kosmos 293 (Zenit-2M)	
19 August 1969, 13:00	Voskhod (11A57)		LC-41/1, Plesetsk	Successful	Kosmos 294 (Zenit-4)	
29 August 1969, 09:05	Voskhod (11A57)		LC-31/6, Baikonur	Successful	Kosmos 296 (Zenit-4)	
2 September 1969, 11:00	Voskhod (11A57)		LC-41/1, Plesetsk	Successful	Kosmos 297 (Zenit-4)	
18 September 1969, 08:40	Voskhod (11A57)		LC-31/6, Baikonur	Successful	Kosmos 299 (Zenit-4)	
24 September 1969, 12:15	Voskhod (11A57)		LC-41/1, Plesetsk	Successful	Kosmos 301 (Zenit-2)	
6 October 1969, 01:45	Vostok-2M (8A92M)		LC-41/1, Plesetsk	Successful	Meteor-1-2	
11 October 1969, 11:10	Soyuz (11A511)		LC-31/6, Baikonur	Successful	Soyuz 6	Crewed orbital flight, 2 cosmonauts Electronic failure prevented rendezvous with Soyuz 7 and Soyuz 8
12 October 1969, 10:44	Soyuz (11A511)		LC-1/5, Baikonur	Successful	Soyuz 7	Crewed orbital flight, 3 cosmonauts Electronic failure prevented rendezvous with Soyuz 6 and Soyuz 8
13 October 1969, 10:19	Soyuz (11A511)		LC-31/6, Baikonur	Successful	Soyuz 8	Crewed orbital flight, 2 cosmonauts Electronic failure prevented rendezvous with Soyuz 6 and Soyuz 7
17 October 1969, 11:45	Voskhod (11A57)		LC-41/1, Plesetsk	Successful	Kosmos 302 (Zenit-4)	
24 October 1969, 09:40	Voskhod (11A57)		LC-1/5, Baikonur	Successful	Kosmos 306 (Zenit-2M)	
12 November 1969, 11:30	Voskhod (11A57)		LC-41/1, Plesetsk	Successful	Kosmos 309 (Zenit-2)	
15 November 1969, 08:30	Voskhod (11A57)		LC-31/6, Baikonur	Successful	Kosmos 310 (Zenit-4)	
3 December 1969, 13:20	Voskhod (11A57)		LC-43/4, Plesetsk	Successful	Kosmos 313 (Zenit-2M)	First orbital flight from Plesetsk Cosmodrome Site 43
23 December 1969, 13:50	Voskhod (11A57)		LC-41/1, Plesetsk	Successful	Kosmos 317 (Zenit-4MK)	
