= List of human spaceflights, 1961–1970 =

This is a detailed list of human spaceflights from 1961 to 1970, spanning the Soviet Vostok and Voskhod programs, the start of the Soviet Soyuz program, the American Mercury and Gemini programs, and the first lunar landings of the American Apollo program.

- Red indicates fatalities.
- Green indicates sub-orbital spaceflight (including flights that failed to attain intended orbit).
- Grey indicates flights beyond low Earth orbit.
- The United States defines spaceflight as any flight reaching an altitude of 50 miles, while the FAI definition requires an altitude of 100 kilometers. During the 1960s, 13 crewed flights of the U.S. North American X-15 rocket plane met the U.S. criteria, of which only two met the FAI's. This article's primary list includes only the latter two flights. A separate, secondary list gives the other eleven which flew between 50 miles and 100 kilometers.

#	Crew	Launch spacecraft	Habitation	Return spacecraft	Brief mission summary
1	(Soviet Union) Yuri Gagarin	12 April 1961 (Soviet Union) Vostok 1			First crewed spaceflight. Reached Low Earth Orbit (LEO), flew around the Earth once.
2	(United States) Alan Shepard (1)	5 May 1961 (United States) Mercury-Redstone 3 (Freedom 7)			First American crewed spaceflight. Did not reach Earth orbit, maximum altitude: 187 km (116 miles).
3	(United States) Gus Grissom (1)	21 July 1961 (United States) Mercury-Redstone 4 (Liberty Bell 7)			Second American crewed spaceflight. Did not reach Earth orbit, maximum altitude: 190 km (118.26 mi).
4	(Soviet Union) Gherman Titov	6 August 1961 (Soviet Union) Vostok 2		7 August 1961 (Soviet Union) Vostok 2	Day-long flight in LEO. Flew around the Earth 17 times. Brief manual control by pilot.
5	(United States) John Glenn (1)	20 February 1962 (United States) Mercury-Atlas 6 (Friendship 7)			First American crewed orbital flight. Flew around the Earth three times.
6	(United States) Scott Carpenter	24 May 1962 (United States) Mercury-Atlas 7 (Aurora 7)			First manual retrofire. Earth photography and study of liquids in weightless conditions.
7	(Soviet Union) Andriyan Nikolayev (1)	11 August 1962 (Soviet Union) Vostok 3		15 August 1962 (Soviet Union) Vostok 3	First instance of two crewed spacecraft in orbit simultaneously.
8	(Soviet Union) Pavel Popovich (1)	12 August 1962 (Soviet Union) Vostok 4		15 August 1962 (Soviet Union) Vostok 4	First instance of two crewed spacecraft in orbit simultaneously.
9	(United States) Wally Schirra (1)	3 October 1962 (United States) Mercury-Atlas 8 (Sigma 7)			First flawless Mercury mission.
10	(United States) Gordon Cooper (1)	15 May 1963 (United States) Mercury-Atlas 9 (Faith 7)		16 May 1963 (United States) Mercury-Atlas 9 (Faith 7)	First live TV from U.S. astronaut.
11	(Soviet Union) Valery Bykovsky (1)	14 June 1963 (Soviet Union) Vostok 5		19 June 1963 (Soviet Union) Vostok 5	Longest solo spaceflight.
12	(Soviet Union) Valentina Tereshkova	16 June 1963 (Soviet Union) Vostok 6		19 June 1963 (Soviet Union) Vostok 6	First woman in space.
13	(United States) Joseph A. Walker	19 July 1963 (United States) Flight 90, X-15			First winged craft in space. Reached altitude of 106 km.
14	(United States) Joseph A. Walker	22 August 1963 (United States) Flight 91, X-15			Reached altitude of 108 km. Walker becomes first person to fly into space twice. X-15-3 (serial 56-6672) becomes first vehicle to fly into space twice.
15	(Soviet Union) Vladimir Komarov (1) (Soviet Union) Konstantin Feoktistov (Soviet Union) Boris Yegorov	12 October 1964 (Soviet Union) Voskhod 1		13 October 1964 (Soviet Union) Voskhod 1	First multiple person spaceflight. Biomedical research.
16	(Soviet Union) Alexei Leonov (1) (Soviet Union) Pavel Belyayev	18 March 1965 (Soviet Union) Voskhod 2		19 March 1965 (Soviet Union) Voskhod 2	First EVA.
17	(United States) Gus Grissom (2) (United States) John Young (1)	23 March 1965 (United States) Gemini 3			First to perform orbital maneuvers.
18	(United States) James McDivitt (1) (United States) Ed White	3 June 1965 (United States) Gemini 4		7 June 1965 (United States) Gemini 4	First American EVA.
19	(United States) Gordon Cooper (2) (United States) Pete Conrad (1)	21 August 1965 (United States) Gemini 5		29 August 1965 (United States) Gemini 5	First one week spaceflight. Cooper becomes the first person to orbit the Earth on two different missions.
20	(United States) Frank Borman (1) (United States) Jim Lovell (1)	4 December 1965 (United States) Gemini 7		18 December 1965 (United States) Gemini 7	First two-week spaceflight. First space rendezvous in history with Gemini 6A.
21	(United States) Wally Schirra (2) (United States) Thomas P. Stafford (1)	15 December 1965 (United States) Gemini 6A		16 December 1965 (United States) Gemini 6A	First space rendezvous, with Gemini 7.
22	(United States) Neil Armstrong (1) (United States) David Scott (1)	16 March 1966 (United States) Gemini 8		17 March 1966 (United States) Gemini 8	First docking in space in history with Agena Target Vehicle. Planned EVA cancelled due to early re-entry necessitated by stuck thruster.
23	(United States) Thomas P. Stafford (2) (United States) Eugene Cernan (1)	3 June 1966 (United States) Gemini 9A		6 June 1966 (United States) Gemini 9A	First backup crew to fly space mission.
24	(United States) John Young (2) (United States) Michael Collins (1)	18 July 1966 (United States) Gemini 10		21 July 1966 (United States) Gemini 10	First rendezvous with two different objects.
25	(United States) Pete Conrad (2) (United States) Richard F. Gordon Jr. (1)	12 September 1966 (United States) Gemini 11		15 September 1966 (United States) Gemini 11	Held altitude record prior to lunar missions (1374 km).
26	(United States) Jim Lovell (2) (United States) Buzz Aldrin (1)	11 November 1966 (United States) Gemini 12		15 November 1966 (United States) Gemini 12	First manual rendezvous. Miscellaneous scientific experiments.
27	(Soviet Union) Vladimir Komarov (2)	23 April 1967 (Soviet Union) Soyuz 1		24 April 1967 (Soviet Union) Soyuz 1	Crashed on re-entry. First human fatality during a spaceflight.
28	(United States) Wally Schirra (3) (United States) Donn F. Eisele (United States) Walter Cunningham	11 October 1968 (United States) Apollo 7		22 October 1968 (United States) Apollo 7	First three person U.S. crew. Launched over 20 months after Apollo 1 fatalities.
29	(Soviet Union) Georgy Beregovoy	26 October 1968 (Soviet Union) Soyuz 3		30 October 1968 (Soviet Union) Soyuz 3	Failed to dock with uncrewed Soyuz 2.
30	(United States) Frank Borman (2) (United States) Jim Lovell (3) (United States) William Anders	21 December 1968 (United States) Apollo 8		27 December 1968 (United States) Apollo 8	First crewed mission beyond low Earth orbit; first lunar orbit.
31	(Soviet Union) Vladimir Shatalov (1)	14 January 1969 (Soviet Union) Soyuz 4		17 January 1969 (Soviet Union) Soyuz 4	First crew transfer between space vehicles. First docking of two crewed spacecraft.
32	(Soviet Union) Aleksei Yeliseyev (1) (Soviet Union) Yevgeny Khrunov	15 January 1969 (Soviet Union) Soyuz 5		17 January 1969 (Soviet Union) Soyuz 4	First crew transfer between space vehicles. First docking of two crewed spacecraft.
32	(Soviet Union) Boris Volynov (1)	15 January 1969 (Soviet Union) Soyuz 5		18 January 1969 (Soviet Union) Soyuz 5	First crew transfer between space vehicles. First docking of two crewed spacecraft.
33	(United States) James McDivitt (2) (United States) David Scott (2) (United States) Rusty Schweickart	3 March 1969 (United States) Apollo 9		13 March 1969 (United States) Apollo 9	Tested Lunar Module in low Earth orbit.
34	(United States) Thomas P. Stafford (3) (United States) John Young (3) (United States) Eugene Cernan (2)	18 May 1969 (United States) Apollo 10		26 May 1969 (United States) Apollo 10	Tested Lunar Module in low lunar orbit.
35	(United States) Neil Armstrong (2) (United States) Michael Collins (2) (United States) Buzz Aldrin (2)	16 July 1969 (United States) Apollo 11	Moon	24 July 1969 (United States) Apollo 11	First lunar landing.
36	(Soviet Union) Georgy Shonin (Soviet Union) Valeri Kubasov (1)	11 October 1969 (Soviet Union) Soyuz 6		16 October 1969 (Soviet Union) Soyuz 6	First three-craft spaceflight.
37	(Soviet Union) Anatoly Filipchenko (1) (Soviet Union) Vladislav Volkov (1) (Soviet Union) Viktor Gorbatko (1)	12 October 1969 (Soviet Union) Soyuz 7		17 October 1969 (Soviet Union) Soyuz 7	First three-craft spaceflight.
38	(Soviet Union) Vladimir Shatalov (2) (Soviet Union) Aleksei Yeliseyev (2)	13 October 1969 (Soviet Union) Soyuz 8		18 October 1969 (Soviet Union) Soyuz 8	First three-craft spaceflight.
39	(United States) Pete Conrad (3) (United States) Richard F. Gordon Jr. (2) (United States) Alan Bean (1)	14 November 1969 (United States) Apollo 12	Moon	24 November 1969 (United States) Apollo 12	Second lunar landing. Precision landing near Surveyor 3.
40	(United States) Jim Lovell (4) (United States) Jack Swigert (United States) Fred Haise	11 April 1970 (United States) Apollo 13		17 April 1970 (United States) Apollo 13	Lunar landing aborted following explosion en route.
41	(Soviet Union) Andriyan Nikolayev (2) (Soviet Union) Vitaliy Sevastyanov (1)	1 June 1970 (Soviet Union) Soyuz 9		19 June 1970 (Soviet Union) Soyuz 9	Investigations into effects of prolonged spaceflight. Record duration mission for single spacecraft.

== Flights between 50 miles and 100 kilometers ==
In addition to the above spaceflights, eleven flights of the North American X-15 reached a maximum altitude above 50 miles but below 100 kilometers, thus satisfying the U.S. definition of spaceflight but failing to surpass the Kármán line. Among the twelve X-15 pilots, only Neil Armstrong and Joe Engle would travel to space following their participation in the program. Eleven of the thirteen flights above 50 miles were made in the X-15-3, the program's third plane; only two were made in the X-15-1, its first.

In the below table, "spaceflight" and related phrases refer to the American convention.

#	Crew	Launch spacecraft	Habitation	Return spacecraft	Brief mission summary
—	(United States) Robert M. White	17 July 1962 (United States) X-15 Flight 62			White's only spaceflight. First spaceflight of X-15 program.
—	(United States) Joseph A. Walker	17 January 1963 (United States) X-15 Flight 77			Walker's first spaceflight.
—	(United States) Robert A. Rushworth	27 June 1963 (United States) X-15 Flight 87			Rushworth's only spaceflight.
—	(United States) Joe Engle	29 June 1965 (United States) X-15 Flight 138			Engle's first spaceflight.
—	(United States) Joe Engle	10 August 1965 (United States) X-15 Flight 143			Engle's second spaceflight.
—	(United States) John B. McKay	18 September 1965 (United States) X-15 Flight 150			McKay's only spaceflight.
—	(United States) Joe Engle	14 October 1965 (United States) X-15 Flight 153			Engle's third and last spaceflight, and final flight with X-15 program. First spaceflight of the X-15-1.
—	(United States) William H. Dana	1 November 1966 (United States) X-15 Flight 174			Dana's first spaceflight.
—	(United States) William J. Knight	17 October 1967 (United States) X-15 Flight 190			Knight's only spaceflight. Last successful flight of the X-15-3.
—	(United States) Michael J. Adams	15 November 1967 (United States) X-15 Flight 191			Adams' only spaceflight. Fatal disaster, killing Adams and destroying the X-15-3.
—	(United States) William H. Dana	21 August 1968 (United States) X-15 Flight 197			Dana's second and last spaceflight. Third-to-last flight of X-15 program. Second and last spaceflight of the X-15-1.

== See also ==
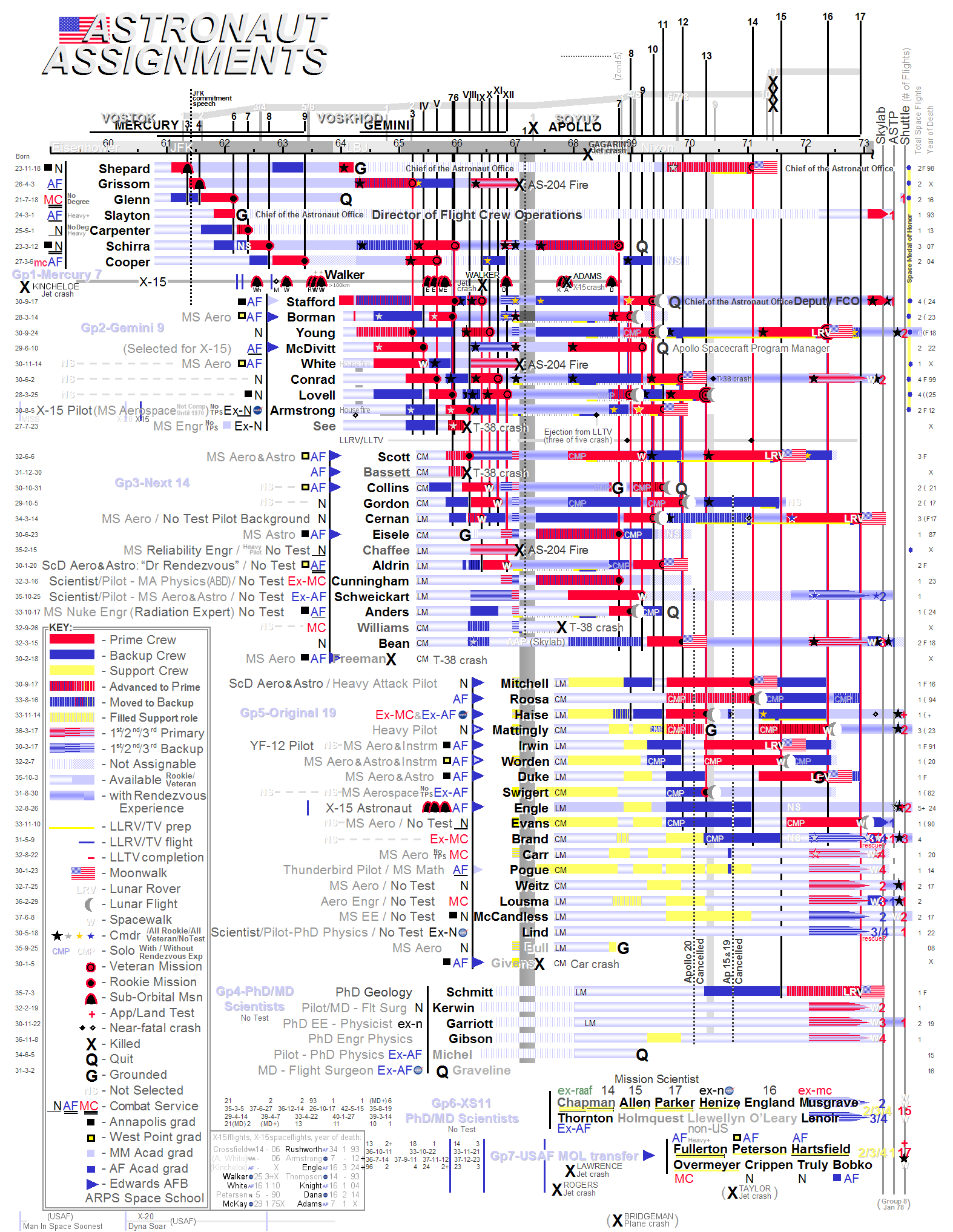
A chart showing U.S. astronaut assignments during the 1960s through the Apollo era.

- List of human spaceflight programs
- List of human spaceflights
- List of human spaceflights, 1971–1980
- List of human spaceflights, 1981–1990
- List of human spaceflights, 1991–2000
- List of human spaceflights, 2001–2010
- List of human spaceflights, 2011–2020
- List of human spaceflights, 2021–present
