= Soyuz 6 =

Crewed flight of the Soyuz programme

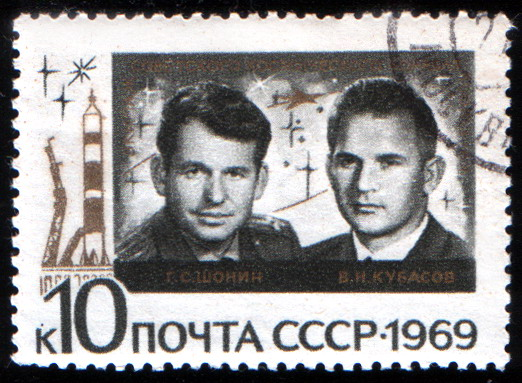
- Georgy Shonin and Valeri Kubasov on 1969 commemorative stamp of Soviet Union
- Mission type: Test flight
- Operator: Soviet space program
- COSPAR ID: 1969-085A
- SATCAT no.: 04122
- Mission duration: 4 days 22 hours 42 minutes 47 seconds
- Orbits completed: 80

Spacecraft properties
- Spacecraft: Soyuz 7K-OK No.14
- Spacecraft type: Soyuz 7K-OK (passive - photographer)
- Manufacturer: Experimental Design Bureau (OKB-1)
- Launch mass: 6577 kg
- Landing mass: 1200 kg

Crew
- Crew size: 2
- Members: Georgy Shonin; Valeri Kubasov
- Callsign: Антей (Antey - "Antaeus")

Start of mission
- Launch date: 11 October 1969, 11:10:00 GMT
- Rocket: Soyuz
- Launch site: Baikonur, Site 31/6

End of mission
- Landing date: 16 October 1969, 09:52:47 GMT
- Landing site: 180 km at northwest of Karaganda, Kazakhstan

Orbital parameters
- Reference system: Geocentric orbit
- Regime: Low Earth orbit
- Perigee altitude: 192.0 km
- Apogee altitude: 231.0 km
- Inclination: 51.68°
- Period: 88.67 minutes

Soyuz 6 (Russian: Союз 6, Union 6) was part of a joint October, 1969, mission with Soyuz 7 and Soyuz 8 that saw the three Soyuz spacecraft in orbit together at the same time, carrying a total of seven cosmonauts. The crew of Georgy Shonin and Valeri Kubasov were meant to take high-quality movie photography of the Soyuz 7 and Soyuz 8 docking, but the rendezvous systems on all three spacecraft failed.

It is still not known exactly what the actual problem was, but it is often quoted as being a helium pressurisation integrity test. The version of Soyuz 7K-OK spacecraft used for the missions carried a torus-shaped docking electronics equipment housing surrounding the motor assembly on the back of the service module, which is thought to have been pressurised with helium to provide an inert environment for the electronics. It was then jettisoned after docking to lower the mass of the spacecraft for reentry. Due to unstable temperature, disparity between the frequencies of the transmitters and receivers, which were stabilised by special quartz resonators, occurred. The piezocrystals were supposed to be in thermostats at a strictly constant temperature.

The crew was made up of Shonin and Kubasov, who carried out experiments in space welding. They tested three methods: using an electron beam, a low-pressure plasma arc and a consumable electrode. While welding, Kubasov almost burned through the hull of the vehicle's Living Compartment, which in the absence of spacesuits could have resulted in a catastrophic situation. The apparatus was designed at the Paton Institute of Electric Welding, Kyiv, Ukraine. The weld quality was said to be in no way inferior to that of Earth-based welds.

After eighty orbits of the Earth, they landed on 16 October 1969, 180 km (110 mi) northwest of Karaganda, Kazakhstan.

The radio call sign of the spacecraft was Antey, referring to the Greek hero Antaeus, but at the time of the flight, however, it was also the name of the largest practicable aircraft, the Soviet Antonov An-22, made in Ukraine. But unlike the call signs of Soyuz 7 and Soyuz 8, it was not the name of a squadron in Soviet military training, of uncertain role, for the one that begins with the letter 'a' is Aktif, meaning "active".

== Crew ==
Position	Cosmonaut
Commander	Georgy Shonin; Only spaceflight
Flight engineer	Valeri Kubasov; First spaceflight

=== Backup crew ===
Position	Cosmonaut
Commander	Vladimir Shatalov
Flight engineer	Aleksei Yeliseyev

=== Reserve crew ===
Position	Cosmonaut
Commander	Andriyan Nikolayev
Flight engineer	Georgy Grechko

== Mission parameters ==
- Mass: 6,577 kg (14,500 lb)
- Perigee: 192.0 km (119.3 mi)
- Apogee: 231.0 km (143.5 mi)
- Inclination: 51.68°
- Period: 88.67 minutes

== Mission ==
The mission objectives included:

- checkout and flight test of spaceborne systems and the modified structure of the Soyuz craft,
- further improvement of the control, orientation, and orbital stabilisation systems and navigation aids,
- debugging the piloting systems by orbital maneuvering of the spaceships in relation to one another,
- testing of a system for control of the simultaneous flight of three spacecraft,
- scientific observations and photographing of geological-geographical subjects and exploration of the Earth's atmosphere,
- studying circumterrestrial space,
- conducting experiments of engineering research and biomedical engineering importance.

== Return ==
Stable two-way radio communications was maintained between the spaceships and the ground stations, and TV coverage was broadcast from the ships during flight. The most significant objective was testing alternate methods for welding using remote handling equipment in the high vacuum and weightless conditions of outer space. In Soyuz 6, the welding unit had the name Vulcan and was controlled remotely by electric cable. Of the three types of welding tried (low pressure compressed arc, electron beam, and arc with a consumable electrode), electron beam was the most successful. Soyuz 6 also performed group flight with Soyuz 7 and Soyuz 8, but it did not dock with either spacecraft.
