= Soyuz 7 =

Crewed flight of the Soyuz programme

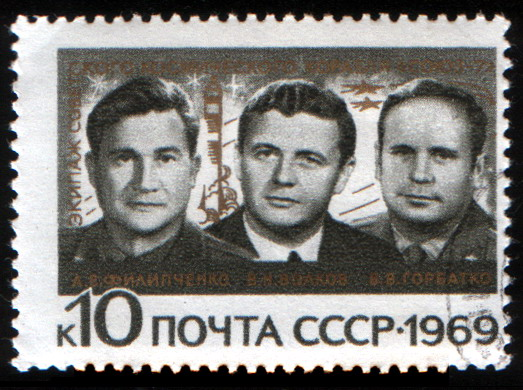
- Filipchenko, Volkov and Gorbatko on a 1969 commemorative stamp of Soviet Union
- Mission type: Test flight
- Operator: Soviet space program
- COSPAR ID: 1969-086A
- SATCAT no.: 04124
- Mission duration: 4 days 22 hours 40 minutes 23 seconds
- Orbits completed: 80

Spacecraft properties
- Spacecraft: Soyuz 7K-OK No.15
- Spacecraft type: Soyuz 7K-OK (passive)
- Manufacturer: Experimental Design Bureau (OKB-1)
- Launch mass: 6570 kg
- Landing mass: 1200 kg

Crew
- Crew size: 3
- Members: Anatoly Filipchenko; Vladislav Volkov; Viktor Gorbatko
- Callsign: Буран (Buran - "Blizzard")

Start of mission
- Launch date: 12 October 1969, 10:44:42 GMT
- Rocket: Soyuz
- Launch site: Baikonur, Site 1/5

End of mission
- Landing date: 17 October 1969, 09:25:05 GMT
- Landing site: 155 km at the northwest of Karaganda, Kazakhstan

Orbital parameters
- Reference system: Geocentric orbit
- Regime: Low Earth orbit
- Perigee altitude: 210.0 km
- Apogee altitude: 223.0 km
- Inclination: 51.65°
- Period: 88.77 minutes

Soyuz 7 (Russian: Союз 7, Union 7) was part of an October 1969 joint mission with Soyuz 6 and Soyuz 8 that saw three Soyuz spacecraft in orbit together at the same time, carrying a total of seven cosmonauts.

The crew consisted of commander Anatoly Filipchenko, flight engineer Vladislav Volkov and research-cosmonaut Viktor Gorbatko, whose mission was to dock with Soyuz 8 and transfer crew, as the Soyuz 4 and Soyuz 5 missions did. Soyuz 6 was to film the operation from nearby.

However, this objective was not achieved due to equipment failures. Soviet sources later claimed that no docking had been intended, but this seems unlikely, given the docking adapters carried by the spacecraft, and the fact that the Soyuz 8 crew were both veterans of the previous successful docking mission. This was the last time that the Soviet crewed Moon landing hardware was tested in orbit, and the failure seems to have been one of the final nails in the coffin of the programme.

The radio call sign of the spacecraft was Buran, meaning blizzard, which years later was re-used as the name of the entirely different spaceplane Buran. This word is apparently used as the name of an active or aggressive squadron in Soviet military training, and just like Soyuz 4, the Soyuz 7 spacecraft was constructed to be the active or male spacecraft in its docking.

== Crew ==
Position	Cosmonaut
Commander	Anatoly Filipchenko; First spaceflight
Flight engineer	Vladislav Volkov; First spaceflight
Research engineer	Viktor Gorbatko; First spaceflight

=== Backup Crew ===
Position	Cosmonaut
Commander	Vladimir Shatalov
Flight engineer	Aleksei Yeliseyev
Research engineer	Pyotr Kolodin

=== Reserve Crew ===
Position	Cosmonaut
Commander	Andriyan Nikolayev
Flight engineer	Georgy Grechko

== Mission parameters ==
- Mass: 6,570 kg (14,480 lb)
- Perigee: 210.0 km (130.5 mi)
- Apogee: 223.0 km (138.6 mi)
- Inclination: 51.65°
- Period: 88.77 minutes

== Mission ==
The mission objectives included:

- checkout the modified structure of the Soyuz craft,
- further improvement of the control, orientation, and orbital stabilisation systems and navigation aids,
- debugging the piloting systems by orbital maneuvering of the spaceships in relation to one another,
- testing of a system for control of the simultaneous flight of three spacecraft,
- scientific observations and photographing of geological-geographical subjects and exploration of the Earth's atmosphere,
- studying circumterrestrial space,
- conducting experiments of engineering research and biomedical engineering importance.

== Return ==
The ship was involved in group flight with Soyuz 6 and Soyuz 8. Docking did not occur, and the ship landed 5 days after launch, at 155 km at the northwest of Karaganda, Kazakhstan.
