= Kosmos 122 =

Soviet weather satellite

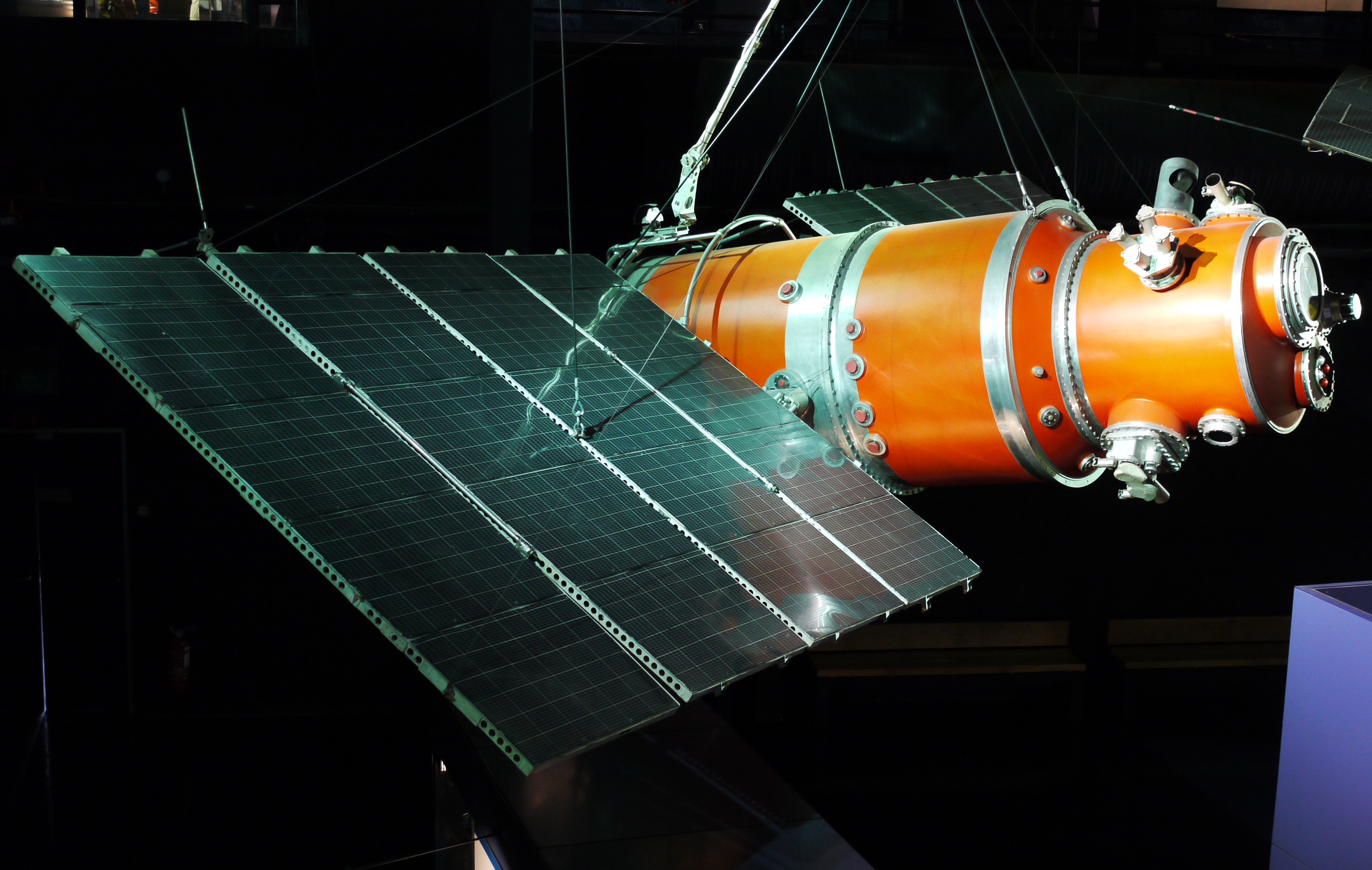
- Mission type: Weather
- Operator: Soviet space program
- COSPAR ID: 1966-057A
- SATCAT no.: 2254
- Mission duration: 123 days (operational); 23 years, 4 months, 20 days (in orbit)

Spacecraft properties
- Spacecraft type: Meteor
- Manufacturer: VNIIEM
- Launch mass: 4,730 kg (10,430 lb)

Start of mission
- Launch date: 25 June 1966, 10:19:00 GMT
- Rocket: Vostok-2M (8A92M) s/n R15001-21
- Launch site: Baikonur, Site 31/6
- Contractor: OKB-1

End of mission
- Last contact: 26 October 1966
- Decay date: 14 November 1989

Orbital parameters
- Reference system: Geocentric
- Regime: Low Earth
- Perigee altitude: 657 km
- Apogee altitude: 683 km
- Inclination: 65.14°
- Period: 97.12 minutes
- Epoch: 25 June 1966

Kosmos 122 (Russian: Космос 122 meaning Cosmos 122), launched on 25 June 1966, Meteor No.5L, and was one of eleven weather satellites put into orbit between 1964 and 1969.

This launch was dubbed a Kosmos satellite mission because that was the designation given to prototype satellites by the Soviet Union. Kosmos 122 was the first announced Russian meteorological satellite and the last in a series of prototype meteorological satellites that included Kosmos 44 (28 August 1964), Kosmos 58 (26 February 1965), Kosmos 100 (17 December 1965), and Kosmos 118 (11 May 1966). It was the last meteorological satellite launched from the Baikonur site with a Vostok-2M launch vehicle at an orbital inclination of 65.0°, and it provided a transition from the prototype series to the Kosmos "Meteor" experimental weather satellite system. The deployment of two other satellites, Kosmos 144 (28 February 1967) and Kosmos 156 (27 April 1967), helped create the first Soviet weather forecasting network. Kosmos 122 and the other satellites had two cameras on board, one high resolution and one infrared in order to see the weather day or night. The Kosmos 122 was a successful mission and this specific satellite was used for four months. These satellites were used until 1969 when they were replaced with an upgraded model officially called Meteor.

== Spacecraft ==
The satellite was in the form of a large cylindrical capsule, 5 metres (16 ft) long and 1.5 metres (4 ft 11 in) in diameter. Two large solar cell panels of three segments each were deployed from opposite sides of the cylinder after satellite separation from the launch vehicle. The solar panels were rotated to constantly face the Sun during satellite daytime by means of a Sun sensor-controlled drive mechanism fitted in the top end of the center body.

The meteorological instruments were housed in a hermetically sealed compartment located in the lower part of the capsule, while the basic satellite servicing systems were contained in a special hermetically sealed compartment in the upper part of the capsule. Data were transmitted to Earth at a frequency of 90 MHz by means of a steerable high-gain parabolic antenna that was attached to the center section of the satellite body by a long arm. The satellite was triaxially stabilized by a series of inertial flywheels, driven by electric motors, whose kinetic energy was dampened by torques produced by electromagnets interacting with the Earth's magnetic field.

Kosmos 122 was oriented by Earth sensors with one of its axes directed Earthward along the local vertical, a second oriented along the orbital velocity vector, and a third oriented perpendicular to the orbital plane. This orientation ensured that the optical axes of the instruments were constantly directed Earthward.

== Instruments ==
The instrumentation consisted of two vidicon cameras for daytime cloud cover pictures, a high-resolution scanning infrared (IR) radiometer for nighttime and daytime imaging of the Earth and clouds, and an array of narrow-angle and wide-angle radiometers for measuring the intensity of radiation reflected from the clouds and oceans, the surface temperatures of the Earth and cloud tops, and the total flux of thermal energy from the Earth-atmosphere system into space, respectively. The experiment terminated operations in October 1966.

| Instrument | Number of spectral bands | Band wavelengths (μm) | Ground swath (km) | Ground resolution (km) |
|---|---|---|---|---|
| TV optical instrument MR-600 | 1 | 0.5–0.7 | 1000 | 1.25 x 1.25 |
| TV infrared instrument Lastocha | 1 | 8–12 | 1100 | 15 x 15 |
| Actinometric instrument | 3 | 0.3–12 | 2500 | 50 x 50 |

=== Dual vidicon cameras ===
The Kosmos 122 dual vidicon camera experiment was designed to test the capability of Russian weather satellites to provide daytime pictures of the Earth's cloud cover distribution, local storms, and global weather systems for use by the Soviet Hydrometeorological Service. The instrumentation consisted of two identical vidicon cameras that were mounted in the satellite base and were directed toward the Earth. Each camera viewed a 500 kilometres (310 mi) by 500 kilometres (310 mi) area – one to the left and the other to the right of nadir – with a resolution of 1.25 kilometres (0.78 mi) at nadir from a satellite altitude of 600 kilometres (370 mi) to 700 kilometres (430 mi). The cameras took a one-frame image of the Earth's cloud cover with slight overlapping of successive frames to provide continuous coverage. The cameras switched on automatically any time the sun was more than 5° above the horizon. Because the Earth illumination varied so much, automatic sensors adjusted the camera apertures to produce high-quality pictures under a variety of illumination conditions. The image formed by each vidicon tube either was transmitted directly to the ground if the satellite was in radio contact with one of two ground stations or was recorded on magnetic tape for later transmission if the satellite was beyond the zone of radio communication.

The TV images received by these ground stations were processed and transmitted to the Hydrometeorological Center in Moscow, where they were analyzed and used in various forecast and analysis products. The pictures were archived at the Hydrometeorological Center. The Kosmos 122 cameras, although having 2.5 times the resolution of those carried on the ESSA satellites, could not provide continuous overlapping global coverage as do the ESSA cameras owing to the lower orbit of the Kosmos 122 satellite (650 kilometres (400 mi) compared to 1,400 kilometres (870 mi)). Thus, to close the gaps in coverage, at least two satellites were required in the weather satellite system. In addition, cloud cover mosaics were produced from 10 or more individual cloud cover pictures at the Hydrometeorological Center to provide a more comprehensive view of global weather systems.

Some of the individual pictures and the cloud mosaics were transmitted to various foreign meteorological centers as part of an international meteorological data exchange program. The United States received some of these pictures at the National Environmental Satellite Service (NESS) in Suitland, Maryland, via the "cold line" facsimile link with Moscow. Pictures were transmitted to NESS from September 11, 1966, through October 26, 1966. These pictures were archived at NESS for 1 yr and then, unless of unusual interest, were discarded.

=== Scanning high-resolution infrared radiometer ===
The high-resolution scanning infrared (IR) radiometer was designed to make measurements of cloud distribution and snow and ice cover on the dayside and nightside of the Earth. The radiometer measured the outgoing radiation from the Earth-atmosphere system in the 8 to 12 μm atmospheric window. Measurements made in this spectral region permitted the construction of brightness patterns of the thermal relief and determination of equivalent radiation temperatures of the Earth's surface and cloud tops. The instrument was a narrow-angle scanning radiometer with an instantaneous viewing angle of 1.5 x 1.5°. It was mounted in the base of the satellite in a sealed instrument compartment with its optical axis directed along the local vertical and toward nadir. The radiometer measured the intensity of the outgoing radiation by comparing the Earth's radiation flux with the radiation flux from space. Each type of radiation entered the radiometer through separate windows, which were oriented in mutually perpendicular directions. The radiation from the Earth-atmosphere system fell on a plane scanning mirror that was mounted at an angle of 45° to the satellite velocity vector and scanned through an angle of ± 50° from nadir.

The radiation was reflected from the scanning mirror through a stationary modulating disk and filter window onto a parabolic mirror that focused the parallel beam through a movable modulating disk onto a thermistor bolometer. The stationary and movable modulating disks provided the channel switching, sending first the Earth-atmosphere radiation and then the space radiation to the parabolic mirror and finally to the bolometer. The bolometer converted the radiant flux into variable electric voltages (0 to 6 V) whose frequency was equal to the modulator frequency and whose magnitudes were proportional to the differences in the radiant flux intensities between Earth and space developed at the bolometer output. During the movement of the scanning mirror through a ± 40° sector, line scanning (40 lines/min) of the target area was accomplished in a plane normal to the orbital plane using a forward and back path, while scanning along the flight path was provided by the relative motion of the satellite with respect to the Earth. In each scan, with the indicated viewing and scanning angles from the satellite's orbital altitude, the radiometer recorded the mean radiation intensities from a band about 1,100 kilometres (680 mi) wide with a resolution of about 15 kilometres (9.3 mi) at nadir to about 24 kilometres (15 mi) to 27 kilometres (17 mi) at the edges. The radiometer was capable of measuring radiation temperatures within 2 to 3° for temperatures above 273 K and within 7 to 8° for temperatures below 273 K.

The video signals were amplified and sent either to the satellite memory unit for later transmission or to the radiotelemetry unit for direct transmission to Earth, depending on whether the satellite was beyond or within the zone of radio communication with a ground receiving station, respectively. The ground receivers recorded the transmitted data in digital form on magnetic tape and simultaneously on 80-mm photographic film in the form of a brightness image of the thermal relief of the Earth-atmosphere system. The data on magnetic tape was processed by computer at the Soviet Hydrometeorological Center and was used to produce a digital map of the equivalent radiation temperature field with a superposed geographic grid. The photographic film was developed and processed into an IR picture also with a superposed grid. The pictures were archived at the Hydrometeorological Center. Some of these pictures were transmitted to various foreign meteorological centers as part of an international meteorological data exchange program. The United States received these pictures at the National Environmental Satellite Service (NESS), Suitland, Maryland, via the "cold line" facsimile link with Moscow. Pictures were transmitted to NESS from mid-September until late October 1966. These IR pictures were kept at NESS for 1 yr and then, unless of unusual interest, were discarded.

=== Actinometric instrument ===
The Kosmos 122 actinometric experiment was designed to measure the outgoing longwave radiation (3 to 30 μm) from the Earth-atmosphere system; the outgoing near ultraviolet (UV), visible, and near-infrared (IR) solar radiation (0.3 to 3 μm) reflected and backscattered by the Earth-atmosphere system; and the effective radiation temperature of the Earth's surface and cloud tops (8 to 12 μm).

The instrumentation consisted of four radiometers: a pair of scanning, narrow-angle, two-channel radiometers and a pair of nonscanning, wide-angle, two-channel radiometers. The narrow-angle (4 by 5° field of view (FOV)) radiometers measured radiation in all three spectral bands, while the wide-angle (136 to 140° FOV) radiometers operated only in the 0.3 to 3 μm and 3 to 30 μm bands. In the narrow-angle radiometer, the 0.3 to 3 μm band was measured in one channel and the 8 to 12 μm and 3 to 30 μm bands were combined in the second channel. In the second channel, the two bands were separated by the exchange of corresponding filters as the radiometer scanned in alternate directions.

The Earth radiation entered the narrow-angle radiometer through a cylindrical fairing (KRS-5 crystal) and fell onto a conical scanning mirror. The radiation was reflected from the mirror through a three-lobed rotating mirror chopper that modulated the radiation flux at a frequency of 80 Hz. The chopper alternately reflected Earth radiation and space radiation, which entered through a separate KRS-5 crystal window, onto one of three openings in a color filter wheel – one filter for each spectral band. The particular spectral band that was passed through then fell on an off-axis parabolic mirror that focused the radiation flux onto a bolometric receiver. Periodic calibration was made when the scanning mirror moved to a 90° angle from nadir with simultaneous turning on and viewing of a silicon standard lamp.

The 0.3 to 3 μm channel did not use the two-beam system or filter switching. The output from the modulated flow of radiation on the bolometer was amplified, rectified, filtered, and fed into the radio-telemetry system over eight channels. The wide-angle radiometers had identical optical systems for both channels. The Earth radiation entered the radiometer through a hemispherical shell composed of quartz or KRS-5 crystal with a coating that determined the passband. The radiation was then modulated with a frequency of 64 Hz and fell on a bolometric receiver. As in the narrow-angle radiometers, the bolometer output was processed and fed into the radio-telemetry system. The wide-angle radiometer was standardised simultaneously with the narrow-angle radiometers by the input of a standard 64 Hz calibrating frequency into the amplification circuit.

The relative RMS measuring error for both types of radiometers was about 0.5%. To provide a backup capability, one wide-angle and one narrow-angle radiometer were held in reserve and could have been activated on command from the ground. The orientation of the Kosmos 122 satellite insured that the primary optical axes of the radiometers were oriented vertically downward toward nadir. The survey of the Earth's surface by both radiometers was carried out by the motion of the satellite relative to the Earth. In addition, the narrow-angle radiometer scanned 66° to either side of nadir in a plane normal to the orbital plane by rocking the scanning mirror about the optical axis. The radiometers covered a strip about 2,500 kilometres (1,600 mi) wide on the Earth's surface and had a ground resolution of 50 kilometres (31 mi) at nadir.

The data were reduced at the ground stations and were transmitted in binary form to the Hydrometeorological Center in Moscow, where they were recorded in digital form on magnetic tape and were used to produce various analysis products such as Earth-atmosphere albedo charts and radiation temperature maps. The data were archived at the Hydrometeorological Center. Some of these charts were transmitted in graphical form to various foreign meteorological centers, including the National Environmental Satellite Service (NESS), Suitland, Maryland. These actinometric charts were received at NESS via the "cold line" facsimile link with Moscow from mid-August 1966 until late October 1966. The charts were microfilmed and archived at the National Climatic Data Center (NCDC), Asheville, North Carolina.

== Mission ==
Kosmos 122 was orbited to test meteorological instrumentation designed for obtaining images of cloud cover, snow cover and ice fields on the day and night sides of the Earth and for measuring fluxes of outgoing radiation reflected and radiated by the Earth-atmosphere system.

Kosmos 122 was launched using a Vostok-2M (8A92M) s/n R15001-21 carrier rocket, which flew from Site 31/6 at Baikonur. The launch occurred at 10:19 GMT on 25 June 1966 and was successful. The launch was witnessed by President of France Charles de Gaulle. Kosmos 122 was operated in a low Earth orbit, at an epoch of 25 June 1966, it had a perigee of 657 kilometres (408 mi), an apogee of 683 kilometres (424 mi), an inclination of 65.14° and an orbital period of 97.12 minutes. Kosmos 122 ceased operations on 26 October 1966.

After ceasing operations, Kosmos 122's orbit would naturally decay. It reentered the atmosphere in November 1989.
