= Engineering education research =

Study of engineering education

Engineering education research is the field of inquiry that creates knowledge which aims to define, inform, and improve the education of engineers. It achieves this through research on topics such as: epistemology, policy, assessment, pedagogy, diversity, amongst others, as they pertain to engineering.

== History and background ==
Engineering education research gained visibility during the 1980s, although the formal education of engineers in the United States traces back to as early as 1802, with the establishment of the United States Military Academy at West Point for the purpose of training the U.S. Army's corps of engineers. The Rensselaer School (now Rensselaer Polytechnic Institute) was founded in 1824 and conferred degrees in civil engineering upon four students in 1835.

Spurred by concerns of national competitiveness and the insufficient number of graduating engineers the Neal Report called for research to improve teaching and learning in STEM (Science, Technology, Engineering and Mathematics) fields.

Similar to other disciplines, the 1990s brought a focus on the scholarship of teaching as demonstrated by the 1995 NRC Report, "Engineering education: Designing an adaptive system", influenced by Ernst Boyer. This focus was primarily motivated by the need to improve the quality of engineers produced by universities in the US. Additionally, 1993 marked the relaunch of the Journal of Engineering Education, which served as a clearinghouse for scholarly research.

As concerns regarding globalization and the need for innovation increased during the late 1990s and 2000s, engineering education research was influenced by calls of reform to produce the quantity and diversity of engineers needed to address global problems.

Continuing the development of the field, centers for engineering education research emerged in the early 2000s. The National Academy of Engineering formed a Committee on Engineering Education in 1999, the academy's Center for the Advancement of Scholarship on Engineering Education was established in 2002 and the Center for the Advancement of Engineering in 2003.

During the mid-2000s, dedicated funding, specialized publications, centers for research, academic preparation and conferences which connected the distributed community supplied the infrastructure necessary for the burgeoning field of research.

Influential Reports on the History of Engineering Education

1. Mann, C. (1918). Study of Engineering Education
2. Wickenden Report: Society for the Promotion of Engineering Education. (1930). "Report of the Investigation of Engineering Education 1923-1929." Pittsburgh, PA.
3. L.E. 1995. Report of the American Society for Engineering Education Committee on Evaluation of Engineering Education. Washington, DC: American Society of Engineering Education.
4. “Green Report”. 1995. Engineering education for a changing world. Washington, DC: American Society for Engineering Education. A report prepared by Engineering Deans Council and Corporate Roundtable.

== Notable institutions ==
=== Purdue University ===
Purdue University has contributed to the formal development of engineering education as an academic field. The university established its Department of Freshman Engineering in 1953, one of the earliest centralized first-year engineering programs in the United States. Purdue also created the Women in Engineering Program and Minority Engineering Program in 1969. In 2004, Purdue founded the School of Engineering Education, the first academic unit focused specifically on engineering education, followed in 2005 by what is recognized as the first Ph.D. program in the discipline. These milestones are documented in university archival materials, historical timelines, and published institutional histories.

== Core research areas ==
The 2006 Report of the Steering Committee of the National Engineering Education Research Colloquies outlined the 5 key topic areas of engineering education research as follows:

1. Engineering Epistemologies: Research on what constitutes engineering thinking and knowledge within social contexts now and into the future
2. Engineering Learning Mechanisms: Research on engineering learners’ developing knowledge and competencies in context.
3. Engineering Learning Systems: Research on the instructional culture, institutional infrastructure, and epistemology of engineering educators.
4. Engineering Diversity and Inclusiveness: Research on how diverse human talents contribute solutions to the social and global challenges and relevance of our [the engineering] profession.
5. Engineering Assessment: Research on, and the development of, assessment methods, instruments, and metrics to inform engineering education practice and learning.

There are various doctoral-level (PhD) programs in Engineering Education, with primary research conducted in the aforementioned research areas. The American Society for Engineering Education Student Division created an open source workspace with information on engineering and STEM education, which includes a resource page of degree-granting graduate and/or research programs in Engineering Education.

== Other research areas ==
=== Globalization ===
According to Borrego and Bernhard, international collaborations are developing in an effort to create global competencies in engineering students. Engineering global competency is the possession of "the knowledge, ability, and predisposition to work effectively with people who define and solve problems differently than they do." Educational programs that emphasize global engineering competencies research the development and assessment of global competency within the engineering practice.

Examples of programs in global engineering competency include:

- The Global Engineering Program at Purdue University
- Erasmus mundus (student centric global program)
- Global Engineering Programs at Stanford University
- Tokyo Institute of Technology Global Engineering for Development, Environment and Society
- Global Engineering Engagement at Penn State
- Global Engineering at Missouri University of Science and Technology
- Institute of International Education Global E3
- Texas A&M Global Programs
- University of Colorado Boulder Global Engineering

More examples are listed in Global Engineering Education. Research and development departments in transnational companies also contribute to international educational research. There are various methods for assessing competency and debates on how global and cultural competence training impacts engineering education.

=== Global engineering cultures ===
In 2008, a project titled "The Engineering Cultures Multimedia Project" was approved by the NSF. It was done by combine effort of "Virginia Tech and Colorado School of Mines to produce CD-based modules exploring how what counts as an engineer and engineering knowledge varies from country to country". https://globalhub.org/topics/AboutEngineeringCultures The main goal of this project was "To develop, disseminate, and assess learning experiences that will help students to identify, understand, and value perspectives other than their own."

=== Pre-college engineering education ===
Studies indicate that engineers will be better prepared for rigorous study in the engineering sciences if exposed to engineering concepts in the years prior to university study.

== Methodology ==
“Rigorous” research in engineering education is defined as adherence to the National Research Council’s six guiding principles for scientific inquiry. The six guiding principles for scientific inquiry are:

1. Pose significant questions that can be investigated empirically.
2. Link research to relevant theory.
3. Use methods that permit direct investigation of the question.
4. Provide explicit, coherent chain of reasoning.
5. Replicate and generalize across studies.
6. Disclose research to encourage professional scrutiny and critique.

== Connection to practice ==
Engineering education research is conducted based on the demands and patterns of engineering in industry, policy, and education. Globally, emphasis of research focuses on educational application. Research into industry and practice have yet to gain greater attention.

=== Policy ===
In the United States, there has been a greater push for development of formal policy for educating engineers. In 1918, the Mann Report noted an imminent lack of qualified engineers that could rapidly enter the workforce. There should be more hands-on experience, engineering educators should have practical work experience, and teaching should be more prominent even though research is also important. In 1955, the Grinter report specifically outlined undergraduate and graduate level engineering studies. Since then, some of these suggestions, including the senior capstone design course, have been implemented in public and private engineering institutions.

Engineering education policy applied to program requirements and curricula is externally driven to some degree. ABET (Accreditation Board for Engineering and Technology) accreditation has incorporated industrial demands as part of the college and university program accreditation process. ABET EC 2000 emphasizes both technical (design, problem solving) and professional skills (teamwork, communication, ethical/global thinking). In 2021, Deans from Big Ten+ University Colleges of Engineering wrote a letter of support to ABET to urge more specific criteria in the general assessment related to diversity, equity, and inclusion (DEI).

P-12 Educational Standards:

National policies such as No Child Left Behind and Race to the Top have influenced the recruitment and retention of future engineers.

In April 2013, the Next Generation Science Standards were released as the science standards for K-12 science education in the United States to replace the National Science Education Standards. These include engineering-based standards embedded within the science standards. The National Assessment Governing Board has created a Technology and Literacy Framework for the 2014 National Assessment of Educational Progress. This will be a pilot test and may turn into a permanent fixture of future testing.

=== Educational ===
There is a disconnect between engineering education research findings and implementation of the findings into the classroom. Research findings are published in a variety of journals primarily read by other researchers, not P-12 teachers or university faculty outside of the Education field. This breakdown of transfer between research and practice prevents the desired outcomes at the heart of the research

There have been proposals to connect Engineering Education practice and Engineering Education research. A cyclical model of transfer between research and practice has been proposed by Jesiek et al. (2010) and Borrego & Bernhard (2011). This model allows research and practice to continuously influence and develop one another.

== Organizations and publications ==
There are several professional organizations devoted to engineering education, including:

- American Society for Engineering Education
- European Society for Engineering Education
- International Technology and Engineering Educators Association

== See also ==
- Discipline-based education research
- Engineering education
- Educational research
- Engineering research
- Engineering sciences
- Engineering studies
