= Engineering studies =

Academic field

Engineering studies is an interdisciplinary branch of social sciences and humanities devoted to the study of engineers and their activities, often considered a part of science and technology studies (STS), and intersecting with and drawing from engineering education research. Studying engineers refers among other to the history and the sociology of their profession, its institutionalization and organization, the social composition and structure of the population of engineers, their training, their trajectory, etc. A subfield is for instance Women in engineering. Studying engineering refers to the study of engineering activities and practices, their knowledge and ontologies, their role into the society, their engagement.

Engineering studies investigates how social, political, economical, cultural and historical dynamics affect technological research, design, engineering and innovation, and how these, in turn, affect society, economics, politics and culture.

Engineering studies's mission is to further develop many different aspects of studies of engineers and engineering, it investigates in areas such as: history, culture, polity etc. These studies will have influence on world's engineering level and productivity. Which it provides information and scholar resources for researchers who's interested in studies of engineers and engineering. Also, engineering studies provides a platform for engineering studies research to be reviewed and discussed.

== Subfields and related fields ==
- History of engineering
- Sociology of engineers
- Women in engineering
- Engineering ethnography
- Engineering culture and representation
- Design studies
- Social study of engineering sciences
- Engineering in society and political study of engineering
- Organizational studies of engineers and engineering
- Critical approach and philosophy of engineering
- Engineering education
- Engineering ethics
- Science and technology studies
- Social construction of technology
- Social shaping of technology
- Technological change
- Sociology of innovation
- History of technology
- Constructive technology assessment

== Journals ==
- Engineering Studies
- International Journal of Engineering, Social Justice, and Peace

== Associations ==
- The International Network for Engineering Studies
- Society for the History of the Technology
- Society for Philosophy and Technology
- Society for the Social Study of Science
- European Society for the Study of Science and Technology
- Société d'Anthropologie des Connaissances
- Engineering, Social Justice, and Peace network
