= Soyuz 8 =

Crewed flight of the Soyuz programme

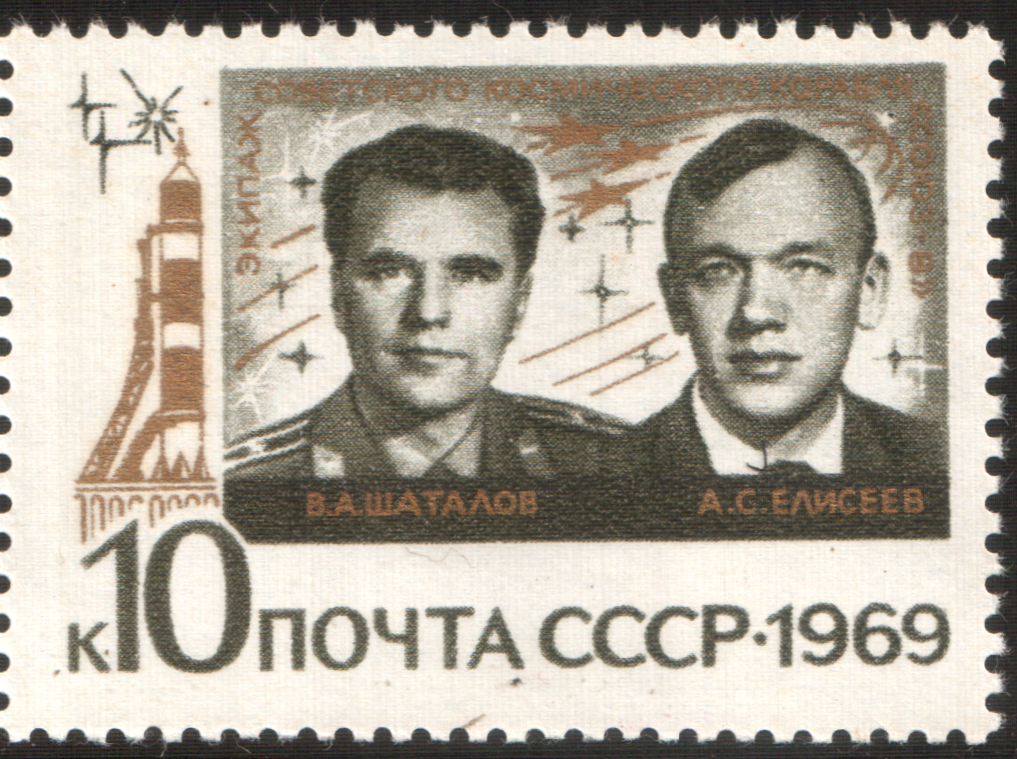
- Shatalov and Yeliseyev on 1969 commemorative stamp of Soviet Union
- Mission type: Test flight
- Operator: Soviet space program
- COSPAR ID: 1969-087A
- SATCAT no.: 04126
- Mission duration: 4 days 22 hours 50 minutes 49 seconds
- Orbits completed: 80

Spacecraft properties
- Spacecraft: Soyuz 7K-OK No.16
- Spacecraft type: Soyuz 7K-OK (passive)
- Manufacturer: Experimental Design Bureau (OKB-1)
- Launch mass: 6646 kg
- Landing mass: 1200 kg

Crew
- Crew size: 2
- Members: Vladimir Shatalov; Aleksei Yeliseyev
- Callsign: Гранит (Granit - "Granite")

Start of mission
- Launch date: 13 October 1969, 10:19:09 GMT
- Rocket: Soyuz
- Launch site: Baikonur, Site 31/6

End of mission
- Landing date: 18 October 1969, 09:09:58 GMT
- Landing site: Kazakh Steppe, Kazakhstan

Orbital parameters
- Reference system: Geocentric orbit
- Regime: Low Earth orbit
- Perigee altitude: 201.0 km
- Apogee altitude: 227.0 km
- Inclination: 51.65°
- Period: 88.72 minutes

Soyuz 8 (Russian: Союз 8, Union 8) was part of an October, 1969, joint mission with Soyuz 6 and Soyuz 7 that saw three Soyuz spacecraft in orbit together at the same time, carrying a total of seven cosmonauts.

The crew consisted of commander Vladimir Shatalov and flight engineer Aleksei Yeliseyev, whose mission was to dock with Soyuz 7 and transfer crew, as the Soyuz 4 (involving, among others, these two cosmonauts) and Soyuz 5 missions did. Soyuz 6 was to film the operation from nearby.

However, this objective was not achieved due to equipment failures. Soviet sources were later to claim that no docking had been intended, but this seems unlikely, given the docking adapters carried by the spacecraft, and the fact that both Shatalov and Yeliseyev were veterans of the previous successful docking mission. This was the last time that the Soviet-crewed Moon landing hardware was tested in orbit, and the failure seems to have been one of the final nails in the coffin of the programme.

The radio call sign of the spacecraft was Granit, meaning Granite. This word is apparently used as the name of a reactive or defensive squadron in Soviet military training, and, just like the Soyuz 5, it was constructed and its crew was trained to be the responsive (not entirely passive) or female spacecraft in its docking. Giving military names to the spacecraft was probably a response to an appeal that the commander of the Soyuz 5 made. Further, the word was probably chosen as it begins with a letter following that sequence starting with Antey (meaning Antaeus) and Buran (meaning Blizzard); Г (G) is the fourth letter of the Russian alphabet.

== Crew ==
Position	Cosmonaut
Commander	Vladimir Shatalov; Second spaceflight
Flight engineer	Aleksei Yeliseyev; Second spaceflight

=== Backup Crew ===
Position	Cosmonaut
Commander	Andriyan Nikolayev
Flight engineer	Vitaly Sevastyanov

== Mission ==
The mission objectives included:

- checkout and flight test of spaceborne systems and the modified structure of the Soyuz craft,
- further improvement of the control, orientation, and orbital stabilisation systems and navigation aids,
- debugging the piloting systems by orbital maneuvering of the spaceships in relation to one another,
- testing of a system for control of the simultaneous flight of three spacecraft,
- scientific observations and photographing of geological-geographical subjects and exploration of the Earth's atmosphere,
- studying circumterrestrial space,
- conducting experiments of engineering research and biomedical engineering importance.

== Mission parameters ==
- Mass: 6,646 kg (14,652 lb)
- Perigee: 201.0 km (124.9 mi)
- Apogee: 227.0 km (141.1 mi)
- Inclination: 51.65°
- Period: 88.72 minutes

== Return ==
Stable two-way radio communication was maintained between the spaceships and the ground stations, and TV coverage was broadcast from the ships during flight. Soyuz 8 was a part of the group flight of Soyuz 6, 7, and 8, and resembled Soyuz 6 in that it was an active ship designed to move toward the passive Soyuz 7. Soyuz 8 was equipped with full docking apparatus and for some hours flew very close to Soyuz 7. No docking occurred. The flight was safely terminated in Kazakh Steppe, in Kazakhstan.
