= Georgy Shonin =

Soviet cosmonaut (1935–1997)

- Георгий Шонин; Георгій Шонін
- Born: 3 August 1935; Rovenky, Soviet Union (now Ukraine)
- Died: 7 April 1997 (aged 61); Zvyozdny, Russia
- Occupation: Pilot
- Awards: Hero of the Soviet Union
- Space career

Cosmonaut
- Rank: Lieutenant General, Soviet Air Force
- Time in space: 4d 22h 42m
- Selection: Air Force Group 1
- Missions: Soyuz 6

Georgy Stepanovich Shonin (Russian: Георгий Степанович Шонин, Ukrainian: Гео́ргій Степа́нович Шо́нін Heorhiy Stepanovych Shonin; 3 August 1935 – 7 April 1997) was a Soviet cosmonaut, who flew on the Soyuz 6 space mission.

Shonin was born in Rovenky, Luhansk Oblast, (now Ukraine) but grew up in Balta in the Ukrainian SSR. His family hid a Jewish family from the Nazis during WWII.

In February 1957, Shonin graduated Naval Aviation School as was awarded his lieutenant's wings. He was then posted to the 935th Fighter Regiment of the Baltic Fleet which was the naval element of the Soviet Air Force. In 1958, he was transferred to the 768th Fighter Regiment of the Northern Fleet based in the Murmansk region. During this time, he would befriend another young flying officer named Yuri Gagarin.

Shonin was part of the original group of cosmonauts selected in 1960. Shonin would fly on Soyuz 6 in October 1969. He left the space program in 1979 for medical reasons. He was then promoted to major general. Shonin later worked as the director of the 30th Central Scientific Research Institute, Ministry of Defence (Russia) where he had management responsibilities for the development of the Buran space shuttle.

He died of a heart attack in 1997.

== Awards and honors ==
- Hero of the Soviet Union
- Pilot-Cosmonaut of the USSR
- Order of Lenin
- Order of the October Revolution
- Order of the Red Banner of Labour
- Order of the Red Star
- Ten commemorative medals
- Medal "25 Years of People's Power" (Bulgaria)
- Three medals from the Mongolian People's Republic
- Five medals from the Czechoslovak Socialist Republic
