= Engineering research =

Field of research

Engineering research - as a branch of science, it stands primarily for research that is oriented towards achieving a specific goal that would be useful, while seeking to employ the powerful tools already developed in Engineering as well as in non-Engineering sciences such as Physics, Mathematics, Computer science, Chemistry, Biology, etc. Often, some of the knowledge required to develop such tools is nonexistent or is simply not good enough, and the engineering research takes the form of a non-engineering science. Since engineering is extensive, it comprises specialised areas such as bioengineering, mechanical engineering, chemical engineering, electrical and computer engineering, civil and environmental engineering, agricultural engineering, etc.

The largest professional organisation is the IEEE that today includes much more than the original Electrical and Electronic Engineering.

Major contributors to engineering research around the world include governments, private business, and academia.

The results of engineering research can emerge in journal articles, at academic conferences, and in the form of new products on the market.

Much engineering research in the United States of America takes place under the aegis of the Department of Defense.

Military-related research into science and technology has led to "dual-use" applications, with the adaptation of weaponry, communications and other defense systems for the military and other applications for civilian use. Programmable digital computers and the Internet which connects them, the GPS satellite network, fiber-optic cable, radar and lasers provide examples.

== See also ==
- List of engineering schools
- Engineer's degree
- Engineering studies
- Engineering education research
