= Kosmos 156 =

Soviet weather satellite

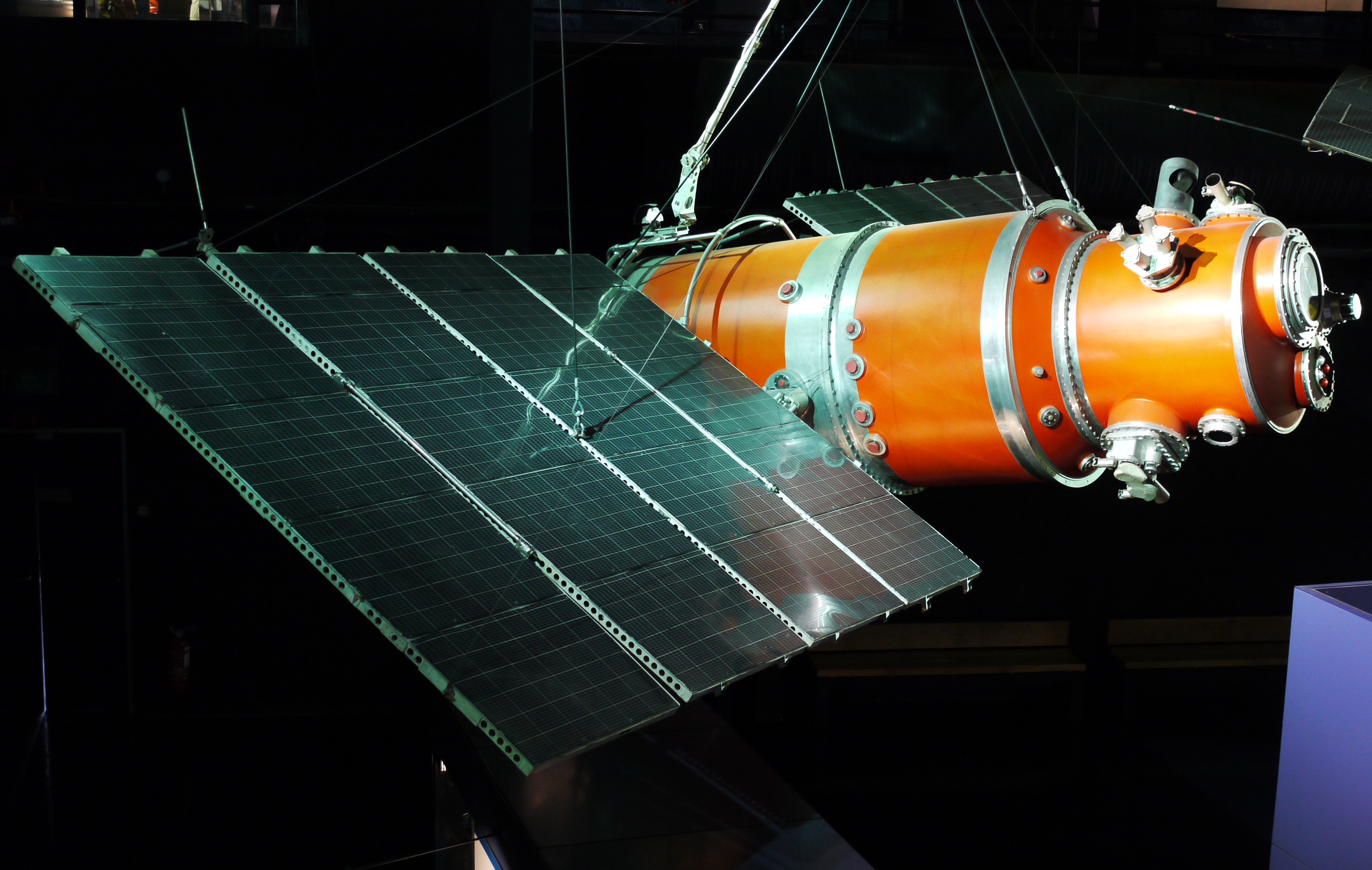
- Mission type: Weather
- Operator: Soviet space program
- COSPAR ID: 1967-039A
- SATCAT no.: 2762
- Mission duration: ~4 months

Spacecraft properties
- Spacecraft type: Meteor
- Manufacturer: VNIIEM
- Launch mass: 4,730 kg (10,430 lb)

Start of mission
- Launch date: 27 April 1967, 12:50:02 GMT
- Rocket: Vostok-2M (8A92M) s/n R15000-22
- Launch site: Plesetsk, Site 41/1
- Contractor: OKB-1

End of mission
- Last contact: Late August 1967
- Decay date: 23 October 1989

Orbital parameters
- Reference system: Geocentric
- Regime: Low Earth
- Perigee altitude: 593 km
- Apogee altitude: 635 km
- Inclination: 81.17°
- Period: 96.96 minutes
- Epoch: 27 April 1967

Kosmos 156 (Russian: Космос 156) was a Soviet weather satellite launched on 27 April 1967, one of eleven weather satellites launched by the Soviet Union between 1964 and 1969. It formed part of the experimental "Meteor" weather satellite system. In 1969, the Kosmos satellite series was scrapped for the more modern and updated Meteor satellite.

== Spacecraft ==
Kosmos 156 was a large cylindrical capsule, 5 metres (16 ft) long and 1.5 metres (4 ft 11 in) in diameter. It had a mass of 4,730 kilograms (10,430 lb). Two large solar panels of four segments each were deployed from opposite sides of the cylinder after satellite separation from the launch vehicle. The solar panels were rotated to constantly face the Sun during satellite daytime using a Sun sensor-controlled drive mechanism fitted in the top end of the centre body. Its meteorological instruments, consisting of a magnetometer, 465-MHz radio antennas, and orbital control devices were housed in a smaller, hermetically sealed cylinder located on the Earthward-facing end of the cylindrical satellite body. The satellite was triaxially stabilised by a series of inertial flywheels driven by electric motors, whose kinetic energy was dampened by torques produced by electromagnets interacting with the Earth's magnetic field. Kosmos 156 was oriented with one axis directed Earthward along the local vertical, another oriented along the orbital velocity vector, and the third oriented perpendicular to the orbital plane. This orientation ensured that the optical axes of the instruments were constantly directed Earthward.

== Instrumentation ==
Kosmos 156's instrumentation consisted of:

- Two vidicon cameras for daytime cloud cover pictures
- A high-resolution scanning infrared radiometer for nighttime and daytime imaging of the Earth and clouds
- An array of narrow-angle and wide-angle radiometers covering the 0.3–3 μm, 8–12 μm, and 3–30 μm channels to measure the intensity of radiation reflected from clouds and oceans, the surface temperatures of the Earth and cloud tops, and the total flux of thermal energy from the Earth-atmosphere system into space, respectively

=== Dual vidicon cameras ===
Kosmos 156's dual vidicon cameras were designed to test the capability of Soviet weather satellites to provide daytime pictures of the Earth's cloud-cover distribution, local storms, and global weather systems. The instrumentation consisted of two identical vidicon cameras that were mounted in the satellite base and were directed toward the Earth. Each camera viewed an area measuring 500 kilometres (310 mi) by 500 kilometres (310 mi), one to the left and the other to the right of nadir, with a resolution of 1.25 kilometres (0.78 mi) at nadir from a satellite altitude of 600–700 kilometres (370–430 mi). The cameras took a one-frame image of the Earth's cloud cover with slight overlapping of successive frames to provide continuous coverage. The cameras switched on automatically any time the sun was more than 5° above the horizon. Automatic sensors adjusted camera apertures to produce high-quality pictures under a variety of illumination conditions.

If the satellite within the radio contact zone of one of two ground stations, images from each vidicon tube were transmitted directly to the ground. Otherwise, they were recorded on magnetic tape for later transmission. The TV images received by these ground stations were processed and transmitted to the Hydrometeorological Center in Moscow, where they were used in forecasting and analysis and subsequently archived.

Kosmos 156 had a significantly lower orbital altitude than its U.S. counterparts, the ESSA satellites (614 kilometres (382 mi) vs. 1,400 kilometres (870 mi). As a result, it could not provide continuous overlapping global coverage despite its cameras having 2.5 times the resolution of those carried on the ESSA satellites. To close coverage gaps, at least two satellites were required in the satellite system. Cloud-cover mosaics were produced from 10 or more individual cloud-cover pictures at the Soviet Hydrometeorological Center to provide a more comprehensive view of global weather systems.

=== Scanning high-resolution infrared radiometer ===
The high-resolution scanning infrared (IR) radiometer made measurements of cloud distribution and snow and ice cover on the dayside and nightside of Earth. The radiometer measured the outgoing radiation from the Earth-atmosphere system in the 8–12 μm atmospheric window, permitting the construction of thermal relief brightness patterns and the determination of equivalent radiation temperatures of the Earth's surface and cloud tops. The instrument was a narrow-angle scanning radiometer with an instantaneous viewing angle of 1.5 × 1.5°. It was mounted in a sealed instrument compartment in the base of the satellite with its optical axis directed along the local vertical and toward nadir. The radiometer measured the intensity of the outgoing radiation by comparing the Earth's radiation flux with the radiation flux from space. Different types of radiation entered the radiometer through separate, perpendicularly-oriented windows. The radiation from the Earth-atmosphere system fell on a plane scanning mirror that was mounted at an angle of 45° to the satellite velocity vector and scanned through an angle of ± 50° from nadir.

Before reaching the thermistor bolometer, radiation was reflected from the scanning mirror, passed through a stationary modulating disk and filter window onto a parabolic mirror, and finally focused into a parallel beam which passed through a movable modulating disk. The stationary and movable modulating disks provided channel switching, first sending the Earth-atmosphere radiation and then the space radiation to the parabolic mirror and bolometer. The bolometer converted the radiant flux into variable electric voltages (0 to 6 V) whose frequency was equal to the modulator frequency and whose magnitudes were proportional to the differences in the radiant flux intensities between Earth and space developed at the bolometer output. During the movement of the scanning mirror through a ± 40° sector, line scanning (40 lines/min) of the target area was accomplished in a plane normal to the orbital plane using a forward and back path, while scanning along the flight path was provided by the relative motion of the satellite concerning the Earth. In each scan, with the indicated viewing and scanning angles from the satellite's orbital altitude, the radiometer recorded the mean radiation intensities from a band about 1,100 kilometres (680 mi) wide with a resolution of approximately 15 kilometres (9.3 mi) at nadir to approximately 24–27 kilometres (15–17 mi) at the edges. The radiometer was capable of measuring radiation temperatures within 2–3° for temperatures above 273 K and within 7–8° for temperatures below 273 K.

As with signals from the vidicon cameras, radiometer video signals were amplified and either sent to the satellite memory unit for later transmission or to the radiotelemetry unit for direct transmission to Earth, depending on whether the satellite's distance to a ground receiving station. The ground receivers simultaneously recorded the transmitted data digitally on magnetic tape and 80-mm photographic film as a brightness image of the thermal relief of the Earth-atmosphere system. The data on magnetic tape was processed by computer at the Soviet Hydrometeorological Center and was used to produce a digital map of the equivalent radiation temperature field with a superposed geographic grid. The photographic film was developed and processed into an infrared picture, also with a superposed grid. The pictures were archived at the Hydrometeorological Center.

=== Actinometer ===
The actinometer was designed to measure the outgoing longwave radiation (3–30 μm) from the Earth-atmosphere system; the outgoing near ultraviolet (UV), visible, and near infrared (IR) solar radiation (0.3–3 μm) reflected and backscattered by the Earth-atmosphere system; and the effective radiation temperature of the Earth's surface and cloud tops (8–12 μm).

The instrumentation consisted of four radiometers: a pair of scanning, narrow-angle, two-channel radiometers, and a pair of nonscanning, wide-angle, two-channel radiometers. The narrow-angle (4–5° field of view) radiometers measured radiation in all three spectral bands, while the wide-angle (136–140° FOV) radiometers operated only in the 0.3–3 and 3–30 μm bands. In the narrow-angle radiometer, the 0.3–3 μm band was measured in one channel and the 8–12 and 3–30 μm bands were combined in the second channel. In the second channel, the two bands were separated by the exchange of corresponding filters as the radiometer scanned in alternate directions.

Earth radiation entered the narrow-angle radiometer through a cylindrical fairing (KRS-5 crystal) and fell onto a conical scanning mirror. The radiation was reflected from the mirror through a three-lobed rotating mirror chopper that modulated the radiation flux at a frequency of 80 Hz. The chopper alternately reflected Earth radiation and space radiation, which entered through a separate KRS-5 crystal window, onto one of three openings in a colour filter wheel – one filter for each spectral band. The particular spectral band that passed through then fell on an off-axis parabolic mirror that focused the radiation flux onto a bolometric receiver. Periodic calibration was made when the scanning mirror moved to a 90° angle from nadir with simultaneous turning on and viewing of a silicon standard lamp.

The 0.3–3 μm channel did not use the two-beam system nor filter switching. The output from the modulated flow of radiation on the bolometer was amplified, rectified, filtered, and fed into the radio-telemetry system over eight channels. The wide-angle radiometers had identical optical systems for both channels. The Earth radiation entered the radiometer through a hemispherical shell composed of quartz or KRS-5 crystal with a coating that determined the passband. The radiation was then modulated with a frequency of 64 Hz and fell on a bolometric receiver. As in the narrow-angle radiometers, the bolometer output was processed and fed into the radio-telemetry system. The wide-angle radiometer was standardized simultaneously with the narrow-angle radiometer by the input of a standard 64 Hz calibrating frequency into the amplification circuit.

The relative root mean square measuring error for both types of radiometers was approximately 0.5%. To provide backup capability, one wide-angle and one narrow-angle radiometer were held in reserve and could be activated from the ground. The orientation of the satellite was maintained by the motion of the satellite relative to the Earth, which ensured that the primary optical axes of the radiometers were oriented vertically downward toward the survey of the Earth's surface. The narrow-angle radiometer scanned 66° to either side of nadir in a plane normal to the orbital plane by rocking the scanning mirror about the optical axis. The radiometers covered a strip about 2,500 kilometres (1,600 mi) wide on the Earth's surface and had a ground resolution of 50 kilometres (31 mi) at nadir.

The data were reduced at the ground stations and were transmitted in binary form to the Hydrometeorological Center, where they were recorded in digital form on magnetic tape and were used to produce various analysis products such as Earth-atmosphere albedo charts and radiation temperature maps. The data were archived at the Hydrometeorological Center.

== Mission ==
Kosmos 156 was the fourth announced Soviet meteorological satellite and the second interim operational weather satellite in the experimental "Meteor" system. This particular satellite was one of nine Kosmos meteorological satellites that were launched between 1965 and 1969. It was also the second semi-operational weather satellite launched from the Plesetsk Cosmodrome into a near-polar, near-circular orbit. Unlike U.S. weather satellites, however, the orbit was prograde (not Sun-synchronous) as a result of geographic limitations. Kosmos 156 was launched to test meteorological instruments in a semi-operational mode designed for obtaining images of cloud cover, snow cover, and ice fields on the day and night sides of the Earth. It also measured fluxes of outgoing radiation reflected and radiated by the Earth-atmosphere system.

The mission was launched from Site 41/1 at Plesetsk using the Vostok 2M (8A92M) s/n R15000-22 carrier rocket. The launch successfully occurred at 12:50:02 GMT on 27 April 1967. Kosmos 156 was operated in a low Earth orbit, close to that of Kosmos 144 so that the two satellites would pass over the Soviet Union every six hours. At an epoch of 27 April 1967, it had a perigee of 593 kilometres (368 mi), an apogee of 635 kilometres (395 mi), an inclination of 81.17°, and an orbital period of 96.96 minutes. When two Kosmos "Meteor" system satellites with suitable differences in the longitudes of the ascending nodes were in operation at the same time in near-polar orbits, data could be received from half of the Earth's surface in a 24-hour period. Kosmos 156 ceased its operations in late August 1967.

Some of the meteorological data collected, such as images and maps, were transmitted to various foreign meteorological centres as part of an international meteorological data exchange program. The United States received some of these pictures at the National Environmental Satellite Service (NESS) in Suitland, Maryland, via the "cold line" facsimile link with Moscow. The experiment was short-lived; pictures were transmitted to NESS from late April to late August 1967, after which the experiment was likely terminated. These pictures were archived at NESS for one year and, unless unusually interesting, were then discarded. Albedo charts and radiation temperature maps produced using Kosmos 156's actinometer data were microfilmed and archived at the National Climatic Center (NCC) in Asheville, North Carolina.
