= Vladimir Shatalov =

Soviet cosmonaut (1927–2021)

- Владимир Шаталов
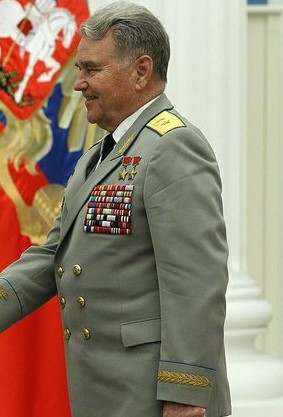
- Shatalov in 2011
- Born: 8 December 1927; Petropavlovsk, Akmolinsk Governorate, Kazak ASSR, Russian SFSR, Soviet Union (now Petropavl, North Kazakhstan Region, Kazakhstan)
- Died: 15 June 2021 (aged 93); Moscow, Russia
- Resting place: Federal Military Memorial Cemetery, Moscow Oblast
- Occupation: Pilot
Awards
Hero of the Soviet Union	Hero of the Soviet Union	Pilot-Cosmonaut of the USSR
		Order of Lenin	Order of Lenin
Order of Lenin	Order of the October Revolution
Several others (see below)
- Space career

Cosmonaut
- Rank: Lieutenant General, Soviet Air Force
- Time in space: 9d 21h 55m
- Selection: Air Force Group 2 (1963)
- Mission: Soyuz 4, Soyuz 8, Soyuz 10 (failed docking with Salyut 1)

Vladimir Aleksandrovich Shatalov (Russian: Владимир Александрович Шаталов; 8 December 1927 – 15 June 2021) was a Soviet cosmonaut who flew three space missions of the Soyuz programme: Soyuz 4 (1969), Soyuz 8 (1969), and Soyuz 10 (1971). From 1987 to 1991, he headed the Yuri Gagarin Cosmonaut Training Center. Lieutenant General, Soviet Air Force (1975).

== Early life ==
Vladimir Shatalov was born on 8 December 1927 in Petropavlovsk, Akmolinsk Governorate, Kazak Autonomous Socialist Soviet Republic, Russian Soviet Federative Socialist Republic, Union of Soviet Socialist Republics (now Petropavl, North Kazakhstan Region, Republic of Kazakhstan). His father, Aleksandr Borisovich Shatalov (1890–1970), was a railway engineer and an early recipient of the Hero of Socialist Labour. His mother, Zoya Vladimirovna Shatalova (née Nikolskaya; 1900–1980), was a housewife.

In 1941, Shatalov graduated from the 6th Grade Secondary School No.4 in Leningrad. During his school years, Shatalov was engaged in aircraft modeling in the Pioneers Palace. In 1941, he took part in the Defense of Leningrad for a month and a half, along with his father at the "Svyazrem-1" repair and restoration train. He helped to build the "Road of Life" across the frozen Lake Ladoga. This was the only route into the city during the bitter winters. Shatalov went back to Petropavlovsk, where his family left for evacuation. In 1943, Shatalov graduated from the seven-year school in Petropavlovsk.

== Early career ==
In early 1945, Shatalov graduated from the 6th Voronezh Air Force Special School, which he was evacuated to Karaganda, followed by Lipetsk. In July 1945, Shatalov entered the 8th Military Aviation School for initial training of pilots. However, in August 1945, the school had closed. Shatalov continued his studies at the Kachinsk Military Aviation School, which was situated in Michurinsk, Tambov Oblast at the time. In 1949, Shatalov graduated from college with first category and became a pilot. From 7 September 1949, Shatalov served as an instructor pilot and, from 14 June 1951, served as an instructor pilot in piloting techniques of the 706th Training Aviation Regiment of the Kachinsk MAS. From 12 December 1951, Shatalov served as an instructor pilot for the combat use of the 706th TAR.

In 1956, Shatalov graduated from the Command Faculty of the Air Force Academy. From November 1956, Shatalov served as deputy squadron commander, then later — squadron commander, and from May 1960 — deputy commander of an aviation regiment in combat units of the Air Force. From February 1961, Shatalov served as a senior inspector-pilot of the combat training department of the 48th Air Army of the Odessa Military District. Shatalov was a master on multiple aircraft, mostly the Yak and MiG aircraft. The total flight time by the time of enrollment in the cosmonaut corps was more than 2,500 hours.

== Cosmonaut career ==
Shatalov had dreams of flying even higher, but was worried he may be too old to train as a cosmonaut. When Yuri Gargarin became the first man in space in April 1961, he was a full seven years younger. However, in 1962 Shatalov was asked to nominate the five best pilots under his command for consideration as cosmonauts, and put his own name forward at the top of the list. He passed the medical exam and then the interview in Moscow, which included Gargarin himself on the panel. By order of the Commander-in-Chief of the Air Force No.14 on 10 January 1963, Shatalov was enrolled in the Cosmonaut Training Center as a listener-cosmonaut. From January 1963 to January 1965, Shatalov underwent general space training. He studied the systems, design and operating rules of the spacecraft Vostok 3A, Voskhod, Voskhod 2, and Soyuz. On 13 January 1965, after passing the exams, Shatalov was qualified as an Air Force cosmonaut. On 23 January 1965, Shatalov was appointed cosmonaut of the 2nd Detachment (Military Space Programs).

Shatalov was in space three times. He made his first flight on 14 January 1969, on the Soyuz-4 spacecraft. It was the first to carry out manual rendezvous and docking with Soyuz-5. With his participation, for the first time in the world, an experimental space station was created and the transition through open space of cosmonauts Aleksei Yeliseyev and Yevgeny Khrunov from the Soyuz-5 spacecraft to the Soyuz-4 was carried out. There was no internal connecting corridor between the two craft, and so the crew had to step into space using handrails on the craft in order to carry out the transition. For his part in this feat, he was made a Hero of the Soviet Union and awarded The Order of Lenin.

== Later life ==
From 25 June 1971, Shatalov served as Assistant to the Air Force Commander-in-Chief for Space Flight Preparation and Support (Deputy Air Force Commander for Space). From 1971 to 1991, Shatalov was a member of the State Commission on Manned Space Flights. On 28 April 1972, he defended his dissertation at the Gagarin Academy, and received the degree of candidate of technical sciences. In 1980, Shatalov was a consultant for the science fiction film Per Aspera Ad Astra. From 3 January 1987, to 19 September 1991, Shatalov served as the Commander of the Cosmonaut Training Center. By the decree of the President of the Russian Federation of 9 May 1992, Shatalov was transferred to the reserve on 21 May 1992.

Shatalov was married to Musa Andreyevna Ionova (* 1928), and together they had two children named Igor Vladimirovich Shatalov (* 1952) and Yelena Vladimirovna Shatalova (* 1958).

Shatalov died on 15 June 2021 at age 93. His funeral took place on 17 June 2021, at the Federal Military Memorial Cemetery in Mytishchi, Moscow Oblast.

== Honours and awards ==
- Twice Hero of the Soviet Union
  - No.10713 — (22 January 1969)
  - No.85 — (22 October 1969)
- Order "For Merit to the Fatherland" 4th class (4 February 2000)
- Order of Friendship (4 December 2011)
- Three Orders of Lenin
  - No.400926 — (22 January 1969, awarded to Heroes of the Soviet Union)
  - (30 April 1971)
  - (15 January 1976)
- Order of the October Revolution (27 December 1982)
- Order "For Service to the Homeland in the Armed Forces of the USSR" 3rd class (22 February 1989)
- Medal "For Battle Merit" (30 December 1952)
- Jubilee Medal "In Commemoration of the 100th Anniversary of the Birth of Vladimir Ilyich Lenin"
- Medal "For Distinction in Guarding the State Border of the USSR"
- Jubilee Medal "Twenty Years of Victory in the Great Patriotic War 1941–1945"
- Medal "Veteran of the Armed Forces of the USSR"
- Medal "For Strengthening of Brotherhood in Arms", (24 May 1982)
- Medal "For the Development of Virgin Lands" (~1969)
- USSR State Prize (1981)
- Pilot-Cosmonaut of the USSR (22 January 1969)
- Honored Master of Sports of the USSR (21 October 1969)
- Honorary radio operator (1971)
- Honorary Metallurgist (14 July 1972)
- Honorary Surveyor (1988)
- Several commemoration awards

Foreign awards:

- Hero of Labor (Vietnam, 1980)
- Order of Ho Chi Minh (Vietnam, 1980)
- Order of Friendship of Peoples (Democratic Republic of Afghanistan)
- Order "Madara Horseman" (Bulgaria, 2008)
- Medal "100 years of Bulgaria's Liberation from Ottoman Slavery" (People's Republic of Bulgaria)
- Medal "For strengthening the brotherhood of arms" (People's Republic of Bulgaria, 1977)
- Medal "For strengthening friendship in arms" (Czechoslovak Socialist Republic, 1980)
- Order of Playa Girón (Cuba, 1980)
- Order of Solidarity (Cuba, 1983)
- 20th Anniversary Commemorative Medal of the Revolutionary Armed Forces (Cuba)
- Order of Karl Marx (East Germany, 1977)
- Order of Scharnhorst (East Germany, 11 September 1978)
- Gold Medal Brotherhood in Arms (East Germany, 1978)
- Order of the Flag of the People's Republic of Hungary (Hungarian People's Republic, 1981)
- Order of the Polar Star (Mongolian People's Republic, 1983)
- Medal "60 years of the Mongolian People's Army" (Mongolian People's Republic, 1981)
- Medal "Brotherhood in Arms" (Polish People's Republic, 1977)
- Order of freendship (Syria)
- Several other awards

A crater on the Moon was named after Shatalov.

Honorary citizen of the cities: Kaluga, Kurgan (1969), Nalchik (Russia), Karaganda, Petropavl (Kazakhstan), Prague (Czech Republic), Houston (USA).
