= Aleksei Yeliseyev =

Soviet cosmonaut (born 1934)

- Алексей Елисеев
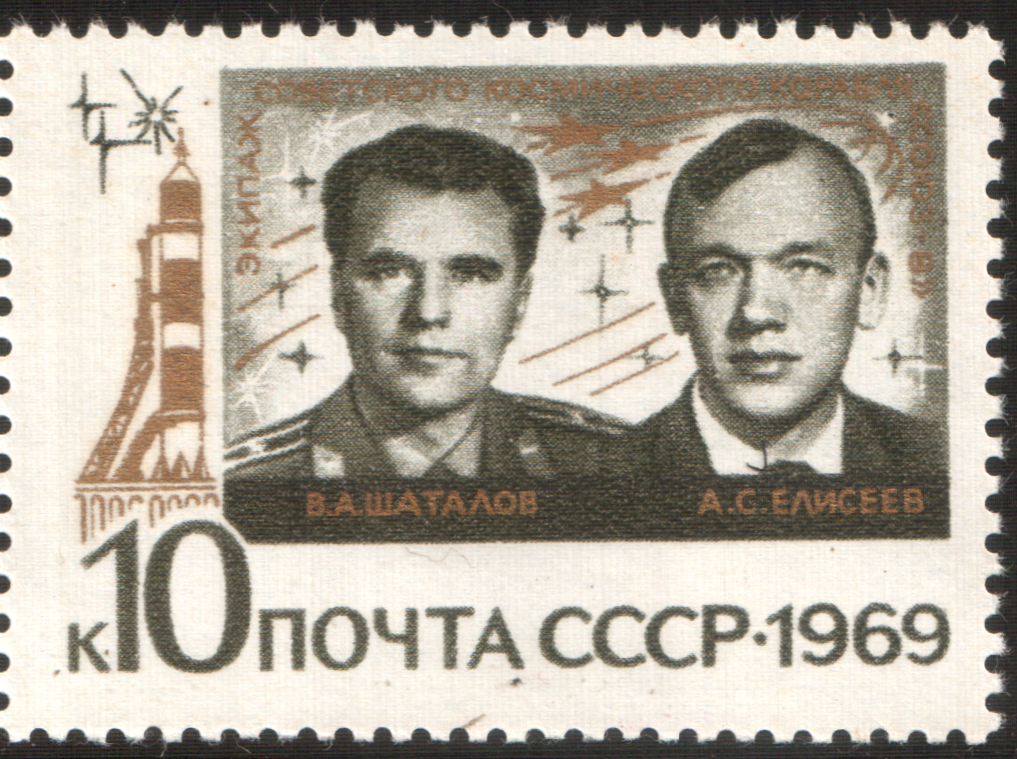
- Yeliseyev (right) on a 1969 Soviet postage stamp
- Born: 13 July 1934 (age 92); Zhizdra, Russian SFSR, Soviet Union
- Occupation: Engineer
- Space career

Cosmonaut
- Status: Retired
- Time in space: 8d 22h 20m
- Selection: Civilian Specialist Group 2
- Total EVAs: 1
- Total EVA time: 37 minutes
- Missions: Soyuz 5/4, Soyuz 8, Soyuz 10 (failed docking with Salyut 1)

Aleksei Stanislavovich Yeliseyev (Russian: Алексей Станиславович Елисеев; born 13 July 1934) is a retired Soviet cosmonaut who flew on three missions in the Soyuz programme as a flight engineer: Soyuz 5, Soyuz 8, and Soyuz 10. He made the world's eighth spacewalk during Soyuz 5 in 1969.

Aleksei's father was Lithuanian with the last name Kuraitis, who died in the Soviet's Gulag as an enemy of the people. Aleksei uses his mother's last name "Yeliseyev" so some regard him as also being a Lithuanian cosmonaut.

A graduate of the Bauman Higher Technical School (1957) and postgraduate of Moscow Institute of Physics and Technology (1962). Yeliseyev worked as an engineer in Sergey Korolev's design bureau before being selected for cosmonaut training.

Following his retirement from the space programme in 1985, he took up at an administrative position at the Bauman school for several years before retiring fully.

== Awards and honors ==
=== Soviet Union ===
- Twice Hero of the Soviet Union (22 January 1969 and 22 October 1969)
- Pilot-Cosmonaut of the USSR
- Four Orders of Lenin (22 January 1969, 22 October 1969, 30 April 1971 and 15 January 1976)
- Medal "For Merit in Space Exploration" (12 April 2011) – for the great achievements in the field of research, development and utilization of outer space, many years of diligent work, public activities
- Jubilee Medal "In Commemoration of the 100th Anniversary since the Birth of Vladimir Il'ich Lenin"
- State Prize of the USSR (3 November 1980)

=== Foreign states ===
- Hero of the People's Republic of Bulgaria
- Order of Georgi Dimitrov (People's Republic of Bulgaria)

== Literature ==
- S. P. Korolev. Encyclopedia of life and creativity – edited by C. A. Lopota, RSC Energia. S. P. Korolev, 2014 ISBN 978-5-906674-04-3
- The official website of the city administration Baikonur - Honorary citizens of Baikonur
