= Beregovoy =

Beregovoy may refer to:

- Beregovoy (surname)
- Beregovoy Camp or Berlag, a Soviet gulag for political prisoners
- Beregovoy, Russia, a rural locality in Zeysky District, Amur Oblast
- Beregovoy, Altai Krai, a rural locality in Russia
- Beregovoy, Volodarsky District, Astrakhan Oblast, a rural locality in Russia
- Beregovoy, Yenotayevsky District, Astrakhan Oblast, a rural locality in Russia
- Beregovoy, Vologda Oblast, a rural locality in Russia

== See also ==
- Beregovaya (disambiguation)
- Beregovoye (disambiguation)
