= Soyuz 2A =

Cancelled 1967 Soviet space flight

Soyuz 2A is the unofficial designation for a cancelled space flight of a Soyuz spacecraft which would have used the 7K-OK No. 5 capsule, planned to rendezvous with the Soyuz 1 mission. The launch of the craft in April 1967 was cancelled due to thunderstorms, likely saving the three-person crew from the same design problems that also killed the one-person crew of Soyuz 1.

In the Soviet space program it was usual only for successful launches to gain official designations, so this mission did not receive an official designation and is informally named Soyuz 2A to distinguish it from the later official Soyuz 2 mission, which was launched in October 1968 as an uncrewed docking target for Soyuz 3.

== Background ==
Over two years had passed since the previous crewed Soviet space flight. To introduce the new Soyuz spacecraft, the Soviets planned an ambitious double mission, which would see the two spacecraft dock and exchange passengers. This was despite the failure of uncrewed tests of the Soyuz spacecraft, which still contained flaws. Political pressure from the Soviet leadership meant the launch of Soyuz 1 went ahead in spite of these problems.

== Crew ==
As with the Voshkod flights, the crew came from different departments, commanded by director of cosmonaut training Nikolai Kamanin, and Vasily Mishin, director of the design engineering department OKB-1.

Since 1965, Kamanin had eight cosmonauts in training for Soyuz missions. Four had already been in space: Yuri Gagarin, Andriyan Nikolayev, Valery Bykovsky, and Vladimir Komarov. Viktor Gorbatko and Yevgeny Khrunov had been with the program since 1960, and Anatoli Voronov and Pyotr Kolodin had been with the program since 1963, but none had flown into space.

Mishin decided to train suitable engineers in his own department as cosmonauts and then nominate them for Soyuz crews. In May 1966 Sergei Anokhin, Aleksei Yeliseyev, and Valeri Kubasov, along with five additional engineers, were added to the group of cosmonauts. A further candidate for mission commander was Georgi Beregovoi, who became a cosmonaut in 1964 due to the promotion of Marshal Rudenko into the group of cosmonauts. Furthermore, Beregovoi was an excellent test pilot, however, he was larger and heavier than the other cosmonauts and he also exceeded the maximum age. The crew assignments were frequently changed. Poor organization also played a role, for in the case of Anokhin there was no spacesuit available for him.

In August 1966 it was decided that Soyuz 1 and Soyuz 2 would be commanded by Komarov and Bykovsky respectively, with Gagarin and Nikolayev as their backups. Two additional crew members would be selected from Anokhin, Yeliseyev, Khrunov, and Gorbatko. This decision was not final, however. The decision regarding the crew escalated to the Central Committee, and in November they issued a dispatch stating that Soyuz 1 should be flown by Komorov, with Gagarin as backup. Soyuz 2 should be commanded by Bykovsky with Nikolayev as backup. Therefore, Beregovoi would not have a space flight until Soyuz 3. As for the two cosmonauts who would transfer after docking from Soyuz 2 to Soyuz 1, Khrunov and Yeliseyev where selected, with Gorbatko and Kubasov as their backups. That meant three of the four spots were taken by experienced cosmonauts, while the fourth was taken by an engineer, and Khrunov had already served as a backup for Alexei Leonov during the Voskhod 2 mission.

== Soyuz 1 problems ==
Soyuz 1, with Komarov on board, was launched on 23 April 1967. Soyuz 2 (including the 7K-OK No. 5 capsule) was to be launched the following day, with both spacecraft spending four days in orbit.

Serious problems soon arose with Soyuz 1, however, particularly the failure of a solar panel to deploy, which caused the spacecraft's systems to become unstable. It was believed that the cosmonauts from Soyuz 2 could solve the Soyuz 1 solar panel problem via an EVA. However, the Soyuz 2 launch could not proceed due to thunderstorms at the launchpad which affected the booster's electrical system. The Soyuz 1 mission was then aborted and Komarov was able to re-enter the Earth's atmosphere. However both parachutes and the retro-rockets failed, and Komarov was killed on impact.

During the course of investigations afterward, it was determined that Soyuz 2 had the same parachute issues as Soyuz 1, and if it had been launched, Bykovsky, Khrunov, and Yeliseyev presumably would have been killed as well.

== Effects ==
The Soyuz 1 disaster set the Soviet space program back 18 months. It was not until October 1968 that the next crewed Soyuz mission was launched, flown by Beregovoi.

Khrunov and Yeliseyev eventually flew on Soyuz 5, which along with Soyuz 4 achieved the objectives of their Soyuz 2 flight in January 1969. Meanwhile, Bykovsky prepared for a planned crewed Moon flight, which was never launched.
