= Soyuz-5 (disambiguation) =

Soyuz-5 may refer to:

- Soyuz 5, a 1969 Soyuz spacecraft mission that performed the first ever space docking with Soyuz 4.
- Soyuz TMA-1, the mission identified by NASA as ISS Soyuz 5.
- Soyuz-5 (rocket), a Russian carrier rocket.
