= Beregovoye (disambiguation) =

Beregovoye (Russian: Береговое) is a rural locality in Altai Krai, Russia

Beregovoye may also refer to:

- Beregovoye field, gas field in Russia
- Beregovoye-Pervoye, village in Russia
- Russian-language name of:

Berehove, Odesa Oblast
Berehove, Yalta Municipality, Crimea
Berehove, village in Feodosia Municipality, Crimea

== See also ==
- Beregovoy (disambiguation)
- Beregovaya (disambiguation)
- Berehove
