= Beregovaya =

Beregovaya may refer to:

- Feminine form of the Russian surname Beregovoy
- Beregovaya, Republic of Buryatia, village in Buryatia, Russia
- Beregovaya compressor station of the Blue Stream pipeline
