= Yastreb =

Russian space suit

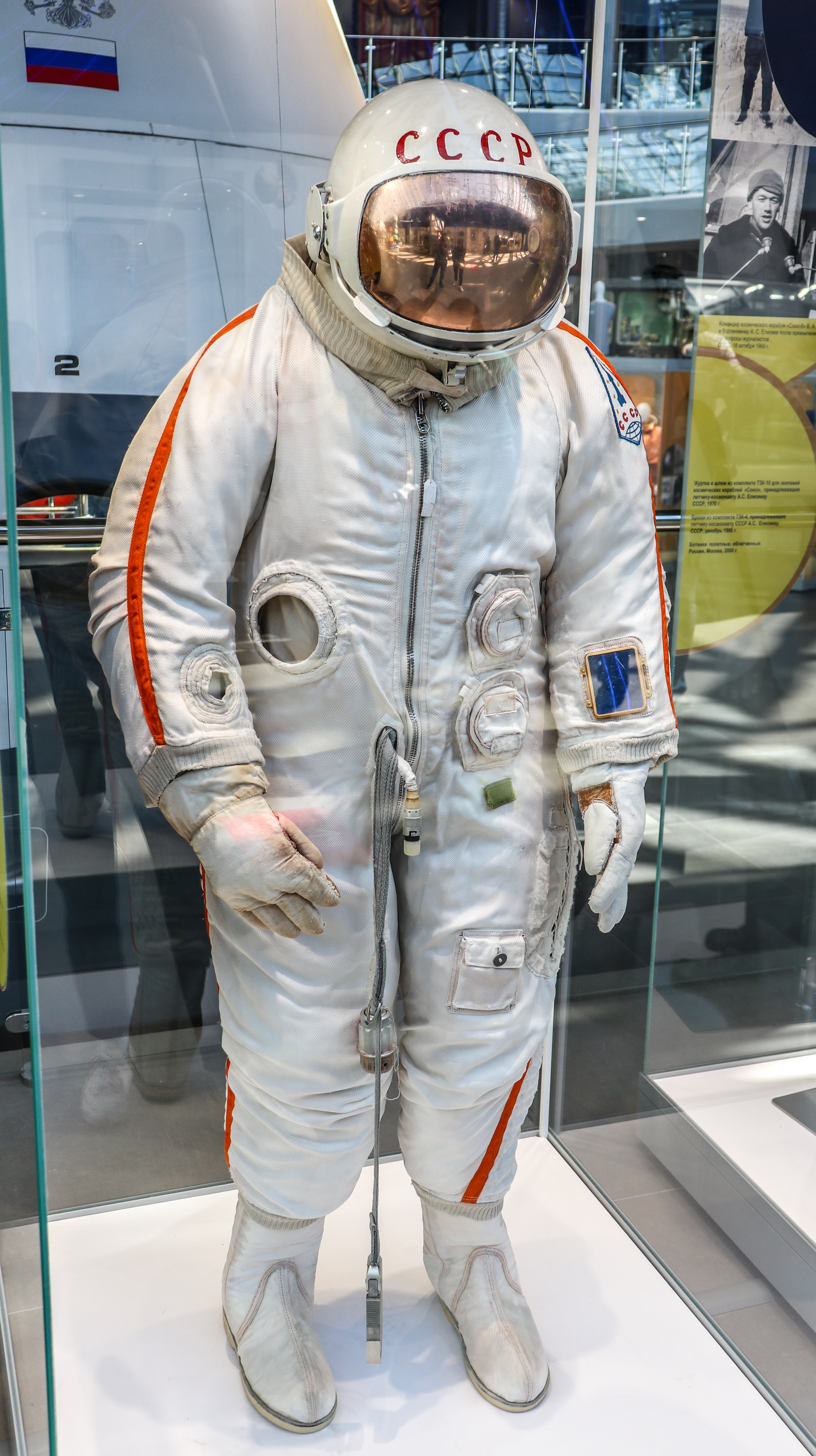
Yastreb Suit

Yastreb (Russian: Ястреб, hawk) is a Soviet space suit that was specially developed for early Soyuz space vehicle missions and for extra-vehicular activity. This model of space suit allowed the cosmonaut to spacewalk from the orbital module of Soyuz.

Design and development of the suit took place in 1966 by the Zvezda Company with input from Alexei Leonov. The Berkut suit that Leonov had used on the Voskhod 2 space walk had ballooned at the joints making movement very difficult. The Yastreb design was a much more stable in sizes using a system of pulleys and lines to regulate movement. The backpack containing life support was mounted in a metal box that could be attached to the chest or to the leg to ease access through the small Soyuz hatch. The suit was to be worn only in the Orbital module of the Soyuz spacecraft and needed two people to put it on. The suit's mobility performance was limited, so during the planned Soviet Moon landing the movements of the cosmonauts would be restricted.

The Yastreb suit was only used once, this was during the Soyuz 4 and Soyuz 5 docking and crew exchange. The suit was not worn during launch or reentry. During the mission both cosmonauts experienced problems with the suit.

== Specifications ==
Name: Yastreb Spacesuit

Manufacturer: NPP Zvezda

Missions: Soyuz 4 and Soyuz 5

Function: Orbital Extra-vehicular activity (EVA)

Operating Pressure: 400 hPa (5.8 psi)

Suit Weight: 20 kg (44 lb)

Backpack Weight: 21 kg (46 lb)

Total Weight: 41 kg (90 lb)

Primary Life Support: 2.5 hours (150 minutes)
