= Beregovoy (surname) =

Beregovoy Ukrainian: Береговий, Russian: Береговой is a surname, its feminine form is Beregovaya. 'Берег' means 'coast. Notable people with the surname include:

- Georgy Beregovoy (1921–1995), Soviet cosmonaut of Ukrainian descent
- Mikhail Beregovoy (1918–2021), Soviet Air Defence Forces officer
- Pierre Bérégovoy (1925–1993), French Prime Minister from 1992 to 1993
