= Soyuz 4 =

Crewed flight of the Soyuz programme

- The departing Soyuz 4 seen from Soyuz 5.
- Mission type: Test flight
- Operator: Soviet space program
- COSPAR ID: 1969-004A
- SATCAT no.: 03654
- Mission duration: 2 days 23 hours 20 minutes 47 seconds
- Orbits completed: 54

Spacecraft properties
- Spacecraft: Soyuz 7K-OK No.12
- Spacecraft type: Soyuz 7K-OK (active)
- Manufacturer: Experimental Design Bureau (OKB-1)
- Launch mass: 6625 kg
- Landing mass: 2800 kg
- Dimensions: 7.13 m long 2.72 m wide

Crew
- Crew size: 1 up 3 down
- Members: Vladimir Shatalov
- Landing: Vladimir Shatalov; Aleksei Yeliseyev; Yevgeny Khrunov
- Callsign: Амур (Amur – "Amur River")

Start of mission
- Launch date: 14 January 1969, 07:30:00 GMT
- Rocket: Soyuz
- Launch site: Baikonur, Site 31/6

End of mission
- Landing date: 17 January 1969, 06:50:47 GMT
- Landing site: 100 km at the southwest of Karaganda, Kazakhstan

Orbital parameters
- Reference system: Geocentric orbit
- Regime: Low Earth orbit
- Perigee altitude: 205.0 km
- Apogee altitude: 223.0 km
- Inclination: 51.73°
- Period: 88.72 minutes

Docking with Soyuz 5
- Docking date: 16 January 1969, 08:20 GMT
- Undocking date: 16 January 1969, 12:55 GMT
- Time docked: 4 hours 35 minutes
- Soyuz programme

Soyuz 4 (Russian: Союз 4, Union 4) was launched on 14 January 1969, carrying cosmonaut Vladimir Shatalov on his first flight. The mission successfully docked with Soyuz 5, marking the first docking of two crewed spacecraft. The craft received two crew members from Soyuz 5 via spacewalk, and returned to Earth.

Three months prior, Kosmos 186 and Kosmos 188 achieved the first uncrewed docking of two Soyuz craft. The previous Soyuz flight (Soyuz 3) was also a docking attempt but failed for various reasons.

The spacewalk was the only use of the Yastreb space suits. As well as mechnical docking, the crafts' electrical circuits were connected, and TASS announced the mission as the "world's first experimental cosmic station". The radio call sign of the crew was Amur, while Soyuz 5 was Baikal. This referred to the trans-Siberian railway project called the Baikal-Amur Mainline, which was in development at the time.

The spacewalk crew transfer technique was intended to be repeated in the Soviet crewed lunar programs, to board the LK lunar lander design from the Soyuz 7K-LOK. The US similarly completed its first docking of two crewed spacecraft with Apollo 9 two months later.

== Crew ==
Position	Launching Cosmonaut	Landing Cosmonaut
Commander	Vladimir Shatalov; First spaceflight	
Flight engineer	None	Aleksei Yeliseyev; First spaceflight
Research engineer	None	Yevgeny Khrunov; Only spaceflight

=== Backup Crew ===
Position	Launching Cosmonaut	Landing Cosmonaut
Commander	Georgy Shonin	
Flight engineer	None	Viktor Gorbatko
Research engineer	None	Valeri Kubasov

=== Reserve Crew ===
Position	Launching Cosmonaut	Landing Cosmonaut
Commander	Georgy Dobrovolsky	
Flight engineer	None	Vladislav Volkov
Research engineer	None	Pyotr Kolodin

== Mission parameters ==
- Mass: 6,625 kg (14,606 lb)
- Perigee: 205.0 km (127.4 mi)
- Apogee: 223.0 km (138.6 mi)
- Inclination: 51.73°
- Period: 88.72 minutes

=== Space walk ===
- Yeliseyev and Khrunov – EVA 1
- EVA 1 start: 16 January 1969, 12:43:00 GMT
- EVA 1 end: 16 January 1969, 13:15:00 GMT
- Duration: 32 minutes

== Preparations and planning ==
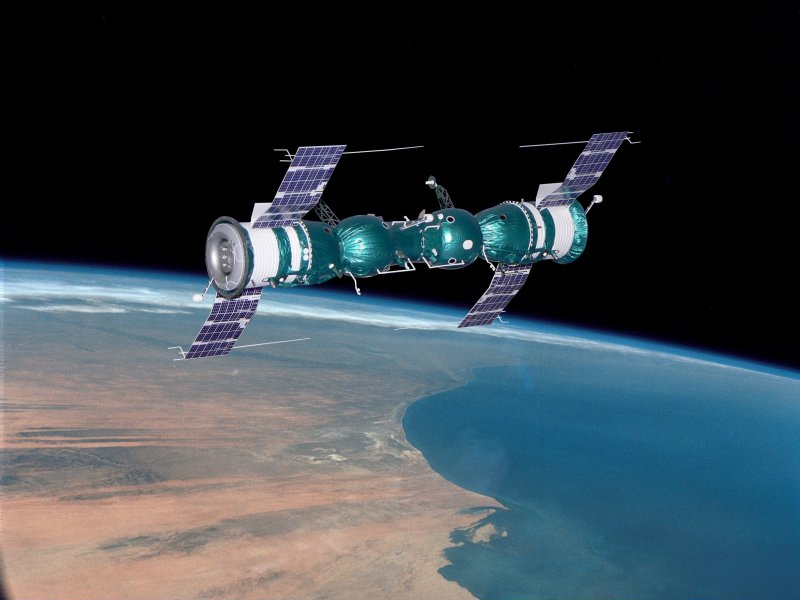
Model of Soyuz 4 and Soyuz 5 after performing the first docking of two crewed spacecraft on 16 January 1969.

After the docking failure of Soyuz 2 and Soyuz 3 in October 1968, efforts were made to revise and improve docking procedures for Soyuz 4 and 5, including their being performed in daylight and over Soviet territory where communication with the ground was possible. The launch dates were tentatively scheduled for January 12–13, 1969. The Soyuz spacecraft for the mission were shipped to the Baikonur launch center during the fall months of 1968.

Mid-winter in Kazakhstan brought about frigid conditions despite the moderate latitude of 45N and personnel accommodations at the launch center were poorly heated and insulated. Temperatures dropped to as low as -25C (-13F) and cases of influenza and frostbite were not infrequent. Several military servicemen, including four officers, died of hypothermia during a hunting trip. However, the cosmodrome was busy this January. Aside from Soyuz 4–5, two Venera probes were launched to Venus and one Zenit reconnaissance satellite during the month, an unsuccessful Proton launch of a Zond spacecraft, and preparations for the first N-1 moon rocket were under way.

As soon as Venera 6 launched successfully from LC-1 on January 10, Soyuz 4's booster was rolled out to the pad. On January 13, the cosmonaut was strapped inside Soyuz 4 and readied for launch. During the countdown, ground crews discovered that the booster had a non-functional roll rate gyro. The launch was called off and the cosmonauts got out and had to wait for the problem to be fixed—it had been only two years since the disastrous on-pad explosion of a Soyuz booster from a gyroscope issue and the memory of that was still fresh. The exact problem with the gyroscope was unclear and could not be reproduced during ground tests, but may have been due to ice formation on a pad umbilical inhibiting electrical contact. However, just to be safe it was decided to replace the entire gyroscope package. Investigation of the gyroscope issue concluded that it was probably a malfunction of the ground support equipment at the cosmodrome, most of which had been in use since the Vostok program began nine years ago and was badly worn and in need of replacement.

There was momentary concern that the launch escape system would not function properly due to the extreme cold as its solid rocket motor was certified to work down to -15C (5F). However, the escape tower had an insulating blanket placed over it and this would probably keep it warm enough. The motor was estimated to lose about 5% of its thrust from the low temperatures but this was still in an acceptable margin should a launch abort be necessary.

On January 14, Soyuz 4 launched at 10:30 AM local time and everything worked perfectly during ascent.

== Mission highlights ==
The Soyuz 4 and 5 spacecraft docked on 16 January 1969, the first time two crewed spacecraft had docked (Apollo 9 would do the same in March of the same year). The two craft possessed only a primitive probe (Soyuz 4) and drogue (Soyuz 5) docking assembly. A connecting tunnel for the docking mechanism had not yet been developed, which prevented a simple internal transfer between the craft. This required the two transferring cosmonauts to spacewalk from one vehicle to the other. Aboard Soyuz 5, Yevgeny Khrunov and Aleksei Yeliseyev immediately began preparing for their extravehicular activity (EVA). Boris Volynov, who would remain aboard Soyuz 5, filmed them donning their Yastreb space suits.

On their 35th revolution of Earth, the two cosmonauts exited the spacecraft for the second Soviet spacewalk. One of Khrunov's lines became tangled and he accidentally closed the tumbler of his suit ventilator. This distracted Yeliseyev who did not set up the movie camera on the orbital module before exiting the spacecraft. As such, there is no film of the historic EVA, only a poor video transmission. One hour later, the two were greeted by Shatalov after the repressurisation of the Soyuz 4 orbital module, which also acted as an airlock. Soyuz 4 and 5 separated after 4 hours and 35 minutes docked together. Soyuz 4 re-entered the atmosphere and landed at 100 km (62 mi) at the southwest of Karaganda, in Kazakhstan, on 17 January 1969.

The mission proved it was possible to perform the activities that would be needed on a Soviet lunar landing. The Soviet plan called for a lone cosmonaut to land on the Moon, return to lunar orbit, then make a spacewalk back from the landing craft to the orbiting spacecraft after docking. This was because there was no internal tunnel between the two craft as found on the American Apollo CSM and LM.

The crew were to meet Leonid Brezhnev during a lavish ceremony at the Kremlin, but this was prevented by an attempted assassination of the Soviet leader. A man shot eight times at the motorcade but aimed at the car containing Georgy Beregovoy, Alexei Leonov, Andriyan Nikolayev, and Valentina Tereshkova. They were unharmed but Brezhnev's car was forced to speed away past the waiting Soyuz 4/5 crews on the podium.

=== EVA details ===
The docking mission had EVA objectives similar to those planned for Apollo 9. Soyuz 4 launched first, and was the active vehicle in the docking with Soyuz 5. The news agency TASS stated that: "there was a mutual mechanical coupling of the ships... and their electrical circuits were connected. Thus, the world's first experimental cosmic station with four compartments for the crew was assembled and began functioning". The mission rehearsed elements of the Soviet piloted lunar mission plan. Moscow TV carried the cosmonauts' EVA preparations live. Khrunov and Yeliseyev put on their Yastreb ("hawk") suits in the Soyuz 5 orbital module with aid from commander Boris Volynov.

Yastreb suit design commenced in 1965, shortly after Alexei Leonov's difficult EVA. Leonov served as a consultant for the design process, which was completed during 1966. Suit fabrication and testing occurred in 1967, but the fatal Soyuz 1 accident in April of that year and docking difficulties on the joint Soyuz 2-Soyuz 3 mission delayed its use in space until Soyuz 4-Soyuz 5.

To prevent the suit ballooning, the Yastreb suit featured a pulley-and-cable articulation system. Wide metal rings around the gray nylon canvas undersuit's upper arms served as anchors for the upper body articulation system. The Yastreb had a regenerative life support system in a rectangular white metal box placed on the chest and abdomen to facilitate movement through the Soyuz's hatchways.

Volynov checked out Khrunov and Yeliseyev's life support and communications systems before returning to the descent module, sealing the hatch, and depressurizing the orbital module. Khrunov went out first, transferring to the Soyuz 4 orbital module while the docked spacecraft were over South America, out of radio contact with the Soviet Union. Yeliseyev transferred while the spacecraft were over the Soviet Union. They closed the Soyuz 4 orbital module hatch behind them, then Soyuz 4 Commander Vladimir Shatalov repressurised the orbital module and entered to help Khrunov and Yeliseyev get out of their suits. The spacewalkers delivered newspapers, letters, and telegrams printed after Shatalov lifted off to help prove that the transfer took place.

== See also ==
- List of spacewalks
