= Soyuz 5 =

Crewed flight of the Soyuz programme

- Aleksei Yeliseyev performing an EVA to transfer from Soyuz 5 to Soyuz 4.
- Mission type: Test flight
- Operator: Experimental Design Bureau (OKB-1)
- COSPAR ID: 1969-005A
- SATCAT no.: 03656
- Mission duration: 3 days 54 minutes 15 seconds
- Orbits completed: 49

Spacecraft properties
- Spacecraft: Soyuz 7K-OK No.13
- Spacecraft type: Soyuz 7K-OK (passive)
- Manufacturer: Experimental Design Bureau (OKB-1)
- Launch mass: 6585 kg
- Landing mass: 2800 kg
- Dimensions: 7.13 m long 2.72 m wide

Crew
- Crew size: 3 up 1 down
- Members: Boris Volynov
- Launching: Aleksei Yeliseyev; Yevgeny Khrunov
- Callsign: Байкал (Baikal - "Lake Baikal")

Start of mission
- Launch date: 15 January 1969, 07:04:57 GMT
- Rocket: Soyuz
- Launch site: Baikonur, Site 1/5
- Contractor: Experimental Design Bureau (OKB-1)

End of mission
- Landing date: 18 January 1969, 07:59:12 GMT
- Landing site: Ural Mountains at 200 km of the southeast of Kostanay, near Orenburg, Kazakhstan

Orbital parameters
- Reference system: Geocentric orbit
- Regime: Low Earth orbit
- Perigee altitude: 210.0 km
- Apogee altitude: 233.0 km
- Inclination: 51.69°
- Period: 88.87 minutes

Docking with Soyuz 4
- Docking date: 16 January 1969, 08:20 GMT
- Undocking date: 16 January 1969, 12:55 GMT
- Time docked: 4 hours 35 minutes
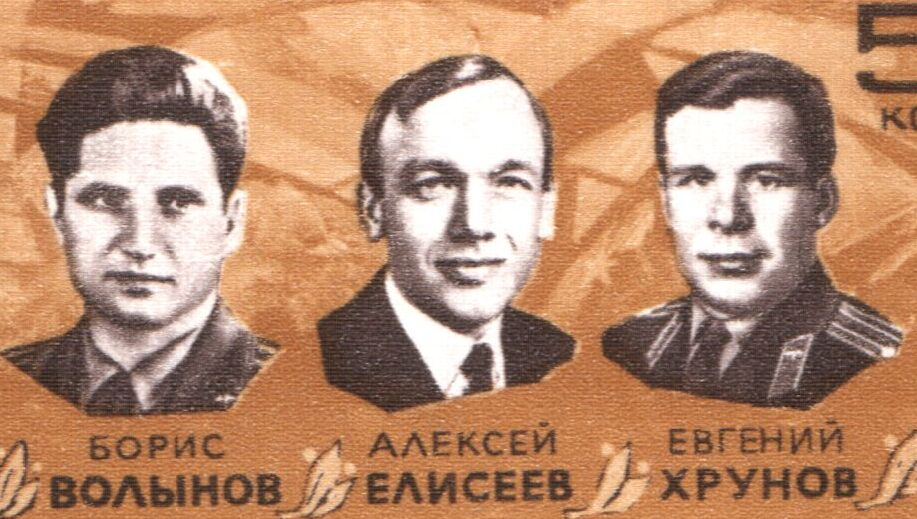
- Boris Volynov, Aleksei Yeliseyev and Yevgeny Khrunov Soyuz programme

Soyuz 5 (Russian: Союз 5, Union 5) was a Soyuz mission using the Soyuz 7K-OK spacecraft launched by the Soviet Union on 15 January 1969, which docked with Soyuz 4 in orbit. It was the first docking of two crewed spacecraft of any nation, and the first transfer of crew from one space vehicle to another of any nation, the only time a transfer was accomplished with a space walk – two months before the United States Apollo 9 mission performed the first internal crew transfer.

The mission, flown by cosmonauts Boris Volynov, Aleksei Yeliseyev, and Yevgeny Khrunov, was also memorable for its dramatic re-entry. The craft's service module did not separate, so it entered the atmosphere nose-first, leaving Volynov hanging by his restraining straps. As the craft aerobraked, the atmosphere burned through the service module, allowing the remaining descent module to right itself before the escape hatch was burned through. During the descent, the parachute lines tangled and the landing rockets failed, resulting in a hard landing that broke Volynov's teeth.

== Crew ==
Position	Launching Cosmonaut	Landing Cosmonaut
Commander	Boris Volynov; First spaceflight	
Flight engineer	Aleksei Yeliseyev; First spaceflight	None
Research engineer	Yevgeny Khrunov; Only spaceflight	None

=== Backup crew ===
Position	Launching Cosmonaut	Landing Cosmonaut
Commander	Anatoly Filipchenko	None
Flight engineer	Viktor Gorbatko	None
Research engineer	Valeri Kubasov	None

=== Reserve crew ===
Position	Launching Cosmonaut	Landing Cosmonaut
Commander	Anatoli Kuklin	None
Flight engineer	Vladislav Volkov	None
Research engineer	Pyotr Kolodin	None

== Mission parameters ==
- Mass: 6,585 kg (14,517 lb)
- Perigee: 210.0 km (130.5 mi)
- Apogee: 233.0 km (144.8 mi)
- Inclination: 51.69°
- Period: 88.87 minutes

=== Space walk ===
- Yeliseyev and Khrunov - EVA 1
- EVA 1 Start: 16 January 1969
- EVA 1 End: 16 January, 01:15 GMT
- Duration: 37 minutes

1900s

== Mission highlights ==
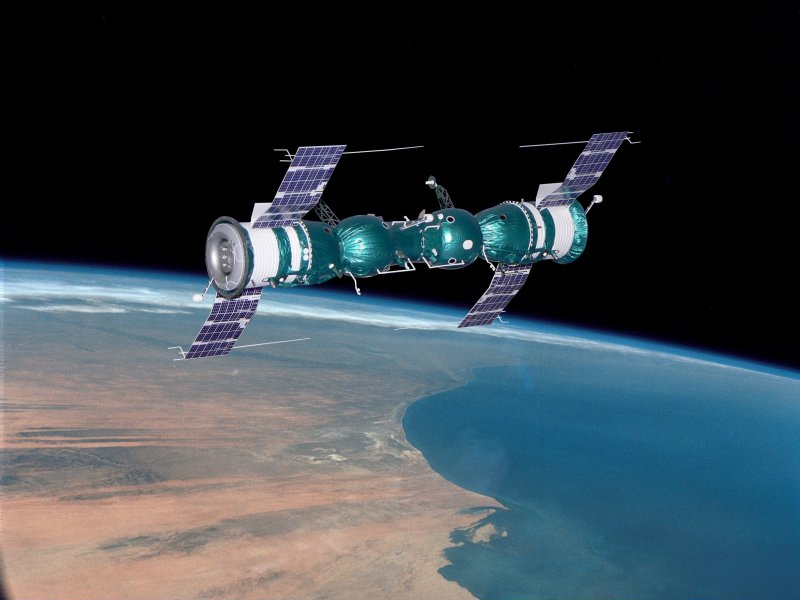
Model of Soyuz 4 and Soyuz 5 after performing the first docking of two crewed spacecraft on 16 January 1969.

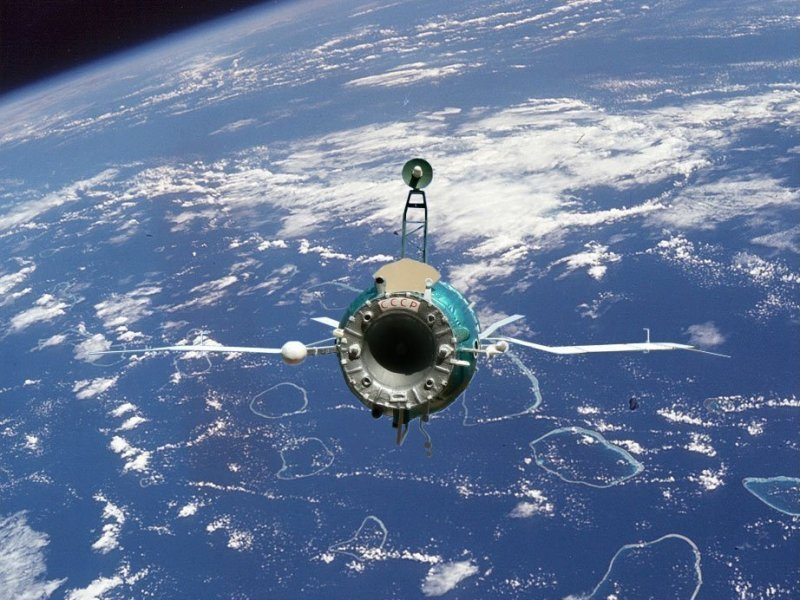
Model of Soyuz 5 approaching Soyuz 4 prior to the first docking of two crewed spacecraft on 16 January 1969.

Launch preparations for Soyuz 5 went smoothly and the frigid mid-winter weather at the cosmodrome moderated a bit on January 15, with temperatures climbing to −7 °C (19 °F). During the countdown, a positive electrical discharge was detected around the base of the booster, so a halt was called to replace a voltage regulator. A technician had to strip down to his underwear in the chilly winter air to be able to fit inside the instrument compartment and remove four bolts holding the regulator in place. He swapped it with a replacement unit but was only able to get three of the bolts in place before his hands began to freeze, so the booster would have to launch with a missing bolt despite the possible safety risk posed. Liftoff took place at 10:04 AM local time and went flawlessly.

Soyuz 5 was piloted by commander Boris Volynov and carried flight engineers Aleksei Yeliseyev and Yevgeny Khrunov as the crew to be transferred to Soyuz 4 for reentry. The mission plan contained scientific, technical, and medical-biological research, testing of spacecraft systems and design elements, docking of piloted spacecraft, and transfer of cosmonauts from one craft to another in orbit.

Volynov remained behind on Soyuz 5, and returned to Earth in a remarkable re-entry. The service module of the Soyuz failed to separate after retrofire, but by that point it was too late to abort. While this had occurred on various Vostok and Voskhod flights, it was a much more serious problem for Volynov, as the Soyuz service module was much larger than the small retropack the earlier vehicles employed.

When the Soyuz started aerobraking in the upper reaches of the atmosphere, the combined spacecraft sought the most aerodynamically stable position - nose forward, with the heavy descent module facing directly into the air stream with only its light metal entry hatch at the front to protect it. The gaskets sealing the hatch began to burn, filling the compartment with dangerous fumes and smoke. The deceleration, while normal for reentry, pulled Volynov outward against his harness rather than against the padded seat. As the thermal and aerodynamic stresses on the combined craft increased, struts between the descent and service modules broke off or burned through before the hatch failed. The descent module immediately righted itself once the service module was gone, with the heat shield forward to take the brunt of re-entry.

There was one final problem in store for Volynov when the parachute cables partially tangled and the soft-landing rockets failed, resulting in a hard impact which broke some of his teeth. The capsule came down in the Ural Mountains at 200 km (120 mi) of the southwest of Kostanay, near Orenburg, Soviet Union, far short of its target landing site in Kazakhstan. The local temperature was −38 °C (−36 °F), and knowing that it would be many hours before rescue teams could reach him, Volynov abandoned the capsule and, having spotted smoke rising from a distant chimney, walked for several kilometers to find shelter at a local peasant's house. It would be seven years until Volynov flew again, on Soyuz 21.

A similar incident occurred decades later with Soyuz TMA-11 on 19 April 2008, though the latter's landing was not as rough.

=== EVA details ===
The mission had extravehicular activity (EVA) objectives similar to those planned for Apollo 9. Soyuz 4 launched first, and was the active vehicle in the docking with Soyuz 5. The news agency TASS stated that: "there was a mutual mechanical coupling of the ships... and their electrical circuits were connected. Thus, the world's first experimental cosmic station with four compartments for the crew was assembled and began functioning".

Moscow TV carried the cosmonauts' EVA preparations live. Khrunov and Yeliseyev put on their Yastreb ("hawk") suits in the Soyuz 5 orbital module with aid from commander Boris Volynov. Yastreb suit design commenced in 1965, shortly after Alexei Leonov's difficult EVA. Leonov served as a consultant for the design process, which was completed during 1966. Suit fabrication and testing occurred in 1967, but the Soyuz 1 accident in April of that year and Soyuz docking difficulties on the Soyuz 2 and Soyuz 3 missions delayed their use in space until the Soyuz 4 and Soyuz 5 flights. To prevent the suit from ballooning, the Yastreb suit used a pulley-and-cable articulation system. Wide metal rings around the gray nylon canvas undersuit's upper arms served as anchors for the upper body articulation system. The Yastreb had a regenerative life support system in a rectangular white metal box placed on the chest and abdomen to facilitate movement through the Soyuz's hatchways.

Volynov checked out Khrunov and Yeliseyev's life support and communications systems before returning to the descent module, sealing the hatch, and depressurizing the orbital module. Khrunov went out first, transferring to the Soyuz 4 orbital module while the docked spacecraft were out of radio contact with the Soviet Union over South America. Yeliseyev transferred while the spacecraft were over the Soviet Union. They closed the Soyuz 4 orbital module hatch behind them, then Soyuz 4 commander Vladimir Shatalov repressurised the orbital module and entered to help Khrunov and Yeliseyev get out of their suits. The spacewalkers delivered newspapers, letters, and telegrams printed after Shatalov lifted off to help prove that the transfer took place. Soyuz 4 and 5 separated after only four hours and thirty-five minutes together.

== See also ==
- List of spacewalks
- Soviet moonshot
