= Beregovoy, Altai Krai =

Beregovoy Береговой
- Settlement
- Location within Altai Krai Location within Russia
- Coordinates: 53°16′N 79°59′E
- Country: Russia
- Region: Altai Krai
- District: Suyetsky District
- Time zone: UTC+7:00

Beregovoy (Russian: Береговой) is a rural locality (a settlement) in Verkh-Suyetsky Selsoviet, Suyetsky District, Altai Krai, Russia. The population was 49 as of 2013. There are 3 streets.

== Geography ==
Beregovoy is located 5 km southwest of Verkh-Suyetka (the district's administrative centre) by road. Osinovsky is the nearest rural locality.
