= Beregovaya, Republic of Buryatia =

Beregovaya Береговая
- Selo
- Location within Republic of Buryatia Location within Russia
- Coordinates: 52°01′N 106°44′E
- Country: Russia
- Region: Republic of Buryatia
- District: Kabansky District
- Time zone: UTC+8:00

Beregovaya (Russian: Береговая) is a rural locality (a selo) in Kabansky District, Republic of Buryatia, Russia. The population was 346 as of 2010. There are 6 streets.

== Geography ==
Beregovaya is located 7 km (4.3 mi) southeast of Kabansk (the district's administrative centre) by road. Nyuki is the nearest rural locality.
