= Mikhail Beregovoy =

Soviet military officer (1918–2021)

- Михаил Тимофеевич Береговой
- Born: 13 January 1918; Chystiakove, Ukrainian People's Republic
- Died: 30 May 2021 (aged 103)
- Burial place: Troyekurovskoye Cemetery
- Military career
- Allegiance: USSR; Russia
- Branch: Soviet Air Defence Forces; Soviet Radio-Technical Forces
- Service years: 1936–1983
- Rank: Lieutenant General
- Awards: Order of the Red Banner (2); Order of the Patriotic War, 1st class; Order of the Red Banner of Labour (2); Order of the Red Star; Order "For Service to the Homeland in the Armed Forces of the USSR", 3rd class; Medal "For Battle Merit"

Mikhail Timofeyevich Beregovoy (Russian: Михаил Тимофеевич Береговой; 13 January 1918 – 30 May 2021) was a Soviet military officer who held a number of posts in the Soviet Air Defence Forces, reaching the rank of lieutenant general.

Born in the upheaval of the October Revolution and the Russian Civil War, Beregovoy became interested in technical innovations. His brothers became pilots, his younger brother Georgy winning fame in the Second World War, and later as a pioneering cosmonaut, and twice Hero of the Soviet Union. Mikhail instead attended the Leningrad Artillery-Technical School and served as an officer with the Soviet Air Defence Forces. Following the war Beregovoy furthered his specialization with studies at the Artillery Radio Engineering Academy, and then joined the Soviet Radio-Technical Forces, in time becoming head of the radio engineering troops of the Moscow Air Defence District, with responsibility for monitoring and providing data for the flights of the early Soviet space program. In 1969 he became head of the Soviet Radio-Technical Forces, a post he held until his retirement in 1983.

Beregovoy reached the age of 100 in 2018, an event marked with congratulatory telegrams, including one from Vladimir Putin. Over his career he had received numerous awards and honours, including two Orders of the Red Banner. He died in 2021 at the age of 103.

== Early life and career ==
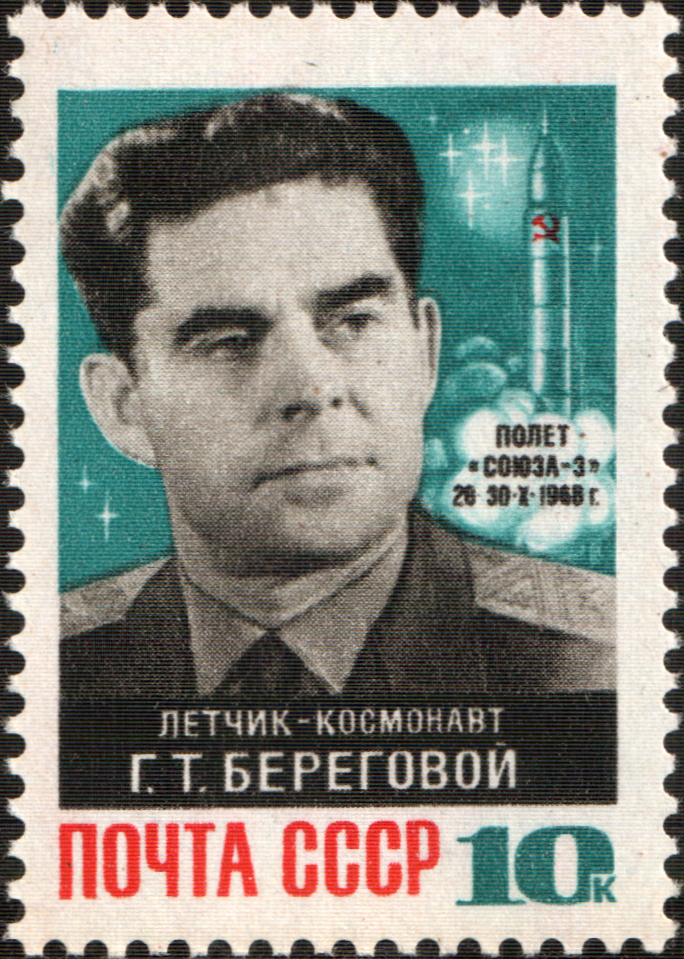
Mikhail's younger brother, Georgy Beregovoy, on a Soviet postage stamp

Beregovoy was born on 13 January 1918 in Chystiakove, which was then part of the brief Ukrainian People's Republic during the period following the October Revolution and during the Russian Civil War. His father worked as a telegraph operator on the railways. The family moved to Yenakiyevo when Mikhail was seven. He had two brothers; the elder, Viktor, and the younger, Georgy, both became pilots. Viktor was caught in the Great Purge of the late 1930s, and was arrested and executed in 1938. He was subsequently rehabilitated. Georgy went on to become a distinguished pilot and pioneering cosmonaut, and twice Hero of the Soviet Union. Mikhail preferred to be a designer of aircraft or other equipment.

Beregovoy studied at the Leningrad Artillery-Technical School, graduating ahead of schedule in 1939 after the outbreak of the Winter War that year. He was then employed by the school as a cadet unit commander and teacher. Following the Axis invasion of the Soviet Union in 1941, Beregovoy took part in fighting at the front. In 1943 he became a staff officer at a regimental headquarters, and by the end of the war, was serving as a staff officer at the headquarters of the Air Defence's South-Western Front.

== Postwar service ==
Following the war, Beregovoy enrolled in the Artillery Radio Engineering Academy, graduating in 1951 and entering service with the Soviet Radio-Technical Forces. He rose from the command of a radio engineering regiment to deputy head and then head of the radio engineering troops of the Moscow Air Defence District. He also had responsibility for monitoring and providing data for the flights of the early Soviet space programme. This became particularly important during the Voskhod 2 mission, when the capsule containing cosmonauts Pavel Belyayev and Alexei Leonov overshot their landing zone. Using the radio telemetry they had recorded, Beregovoy and his men were able to guide rescue teams to the location of the landing site.

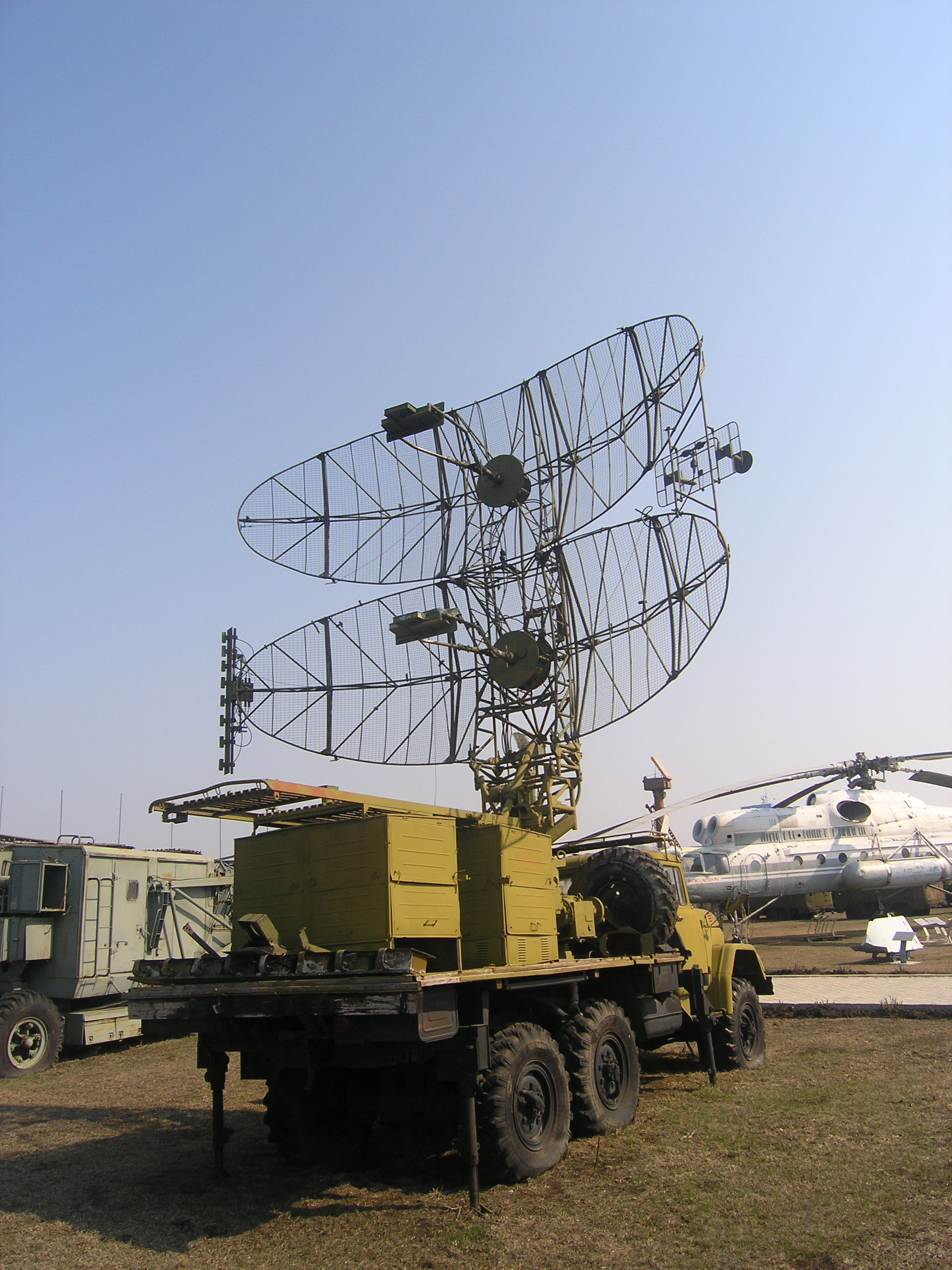
The P-19 radar, which entered service with Soviet forces during the 1970s, during Beregovoy's time as head of the Soviet Radio-Technical Forces

Between 1969 and 1983 he was head of the Soviet Radio-Technical Forces. Beregovoy retired in 1983, having spent 47 years in the Soviet Armed Forces, 32 of them in various positions in the Radio-Technical Forces. He had been promoted to major general on 22 February 1963, and to lieutenant general on 19 February 1968. He settled in Balashikha, his home since the 1970s.

== Retirement and centenary ==
Beregovoy celebrated his 100th birthday on 13 January 2018, an event attended by veterans and generals. He received a congratulatory telegram from President Vladimir Putin, reading "Please accept my congratulations on the 100th anniversary, wishes of health and good spirits. You have devoted all your life to defending the Motherland, fought on the fronts of the Great Patriotic War, and in the post-war period made a significant contribution to strengthening the country's defence capability and the development of the Armed Forces. Your path as an officer, a military leader is a vivid example of courage and loyalty to duty". He also received a congratulatory telegram and a television set from the head of Balashikha, Sergei Yurov, as well as a certificate of honour signed by Defence Minister Sergey Shoygu.

Beregovoy died on 30 May 2021 at the age of 103. Over his career he had received numerous honours and awards, including two Orders of the Red Banner, the Order of the Patriotic War First Class, the Order of the Red Banner of Labour, two Orders of the Red Star, the Order "For Service to the Homeland in the Armed Forces of the USSR" Third Class and the Medal "For Battle Merit", among others.
