= Soyuz 2 =

Soviet uncrewed flight of the Soyuz programme

- Mission type: Test flight
- Operator: Experimental Design Bureau (OKB-1)
- COSPAR ID: 1968-093A
- SATCAT no.: 03511
- Mission duration: 3 days
- Orbits completed: 48

Spacecraft properties
- Spacecraft: Soyuz 7K-OK No.11
- Spacecraft type: Soyuz 7K-OK (passive)
- Manufacturer: Experimental Design Bureau (OKB-1)
- Launch mass: 6,520 kg (14,370 lb)
- Landing mass: 2,800 kg (6,200 lb)
- Dimensions: 7.13 m (23.4 ft) long 2.72 m (8 ft 11 in) wide

Start of mission
- Launch date: 25 October 1968, 09:00 GMT
- Rocket: Soyuz
- Launch site: Baikonur, Site 1/5
- Contractor: Experimental Design Bureau (OKB-1)

End of mission
- Landing date: 28 October 1968, 07:51 GMT
- Landing site: Kazakh Steppe, Kazakhstan

Orbital parameters
- Reference system: Geocentric orbit
- Regime: Low Earth orbit
- Perigee altitude: 196.0 km (121.8 mi)
- Apogee altitude: 200.0 km (124.3 mi)
- Inclination: 51.70°
- Period: 88.50 minutes

Soyuz 2 (Russian: Союз 2, Union 2) was an uncrewed spacecraft (capsule number 7K-OK-P No. 11) in the Soyuz family, intended to be the target of a docking maneuver by the crewed Soyuz 3 spacecraft. It was intended to be the first docking of a crewed spacecraft in the Soviet space program. Although the two craft approached closely, the docking did not take place and the first successful Soviet docking of crewed spacecraft took place in the joint Soyuz 4 and Soyuz 5 mission. It served for the radio search and as a target vehicle for docking by the crewed Soyuz 3. Soyuz 2 soft-landed in a predetermined area of the Soviet Union, near the village of Maiburnak, southwest of the city of Karaganda.

== Mission parameters ==
- Mass: 6,520 kg (14,370 lb)
- Perigee: 196.0 km (121.8 mi)
- Apogee: 200.0 km (124.3 mi)
- Inclination: 51.65°
- Period: 88.50 minutes

== "Crew" hoax ==
Conceptual artist Joan Fontcuberta claimed in 1997 that Soyuz 2 was crewed by Ivan Istochnikov and a dog named Kloka, who disappeared on 26 October 1968, with signs of having been hit by a meteorite. According to Fontcuberta, Soviet officials deleted Istochnikov from official Soviet history to avoid embarrassment; however, the "Sputnik Foundation" discovered Istochnikov's "voice transcriptions, videos, original annotations, some of his personal effects, and photographs taken throughout his lifetime". The exhibition of artifacts (e.g., photographs) related to "Soyuz 2" was shown in many countries, including Spain, France, Portugal, Italy, Mexico, Japan, and the United States. Among other reactions to the exhibition, a Russian ambassador "got extremely angry because [Fontcuberta] was insulting the glorious Russian past and threatened to present a diplomatic complaint".

Several lines of evidence available since the first "Sputnik Foundation" exhibition in 1997 in Madrid revealed that the story and artifacts form an elaborate hoax:

- The name "Ivan Istochnikov" is a Russian translation of Joan Fontcuberta's name; in specific, "Joan" and "Ivan" both translate to "John" and "Fontcuberta" and "Istochnikov" both mean "hidden fountain".
- The photographs of Istochnikov show Fontcuberta's face.
- Pages of the official website of the Madrid exhibition contain the words "PURE FICTION" toward the top of each page in light red text on a dark red background or light pink text on a white background.
- The front and rear endpapers of the catalog accompanying the Madrid exhibition have the words "it's all fiction" in Russian and Spanish printed on them using glow-in-the-dark ink.
- At the website of Spanish newspaper El Mundo, the third of three pages concerning the Madrid exhibition states that "the report which we published on the previous pages is a product of his [Fontcuberta's] imagination".

== See also ==
- Soyuz 2A
