= Beregovoy, Vologda Oblast =

Beregovoy Береговой
- Settlement
- Location within Vologda Oblast Location within Russia
- Coordinates: 59°17′N 38°31′E
- Country: Russia
- Region: Vologda Oblast
- District: Sheksninsky District
- Time zone: UTC+3:00

Beregovoy (Russian: Береговой) is a rural locality (a settlement) in Churovskoye Rural Settlement, Sheksninsky District, Vologda Oblast, Russia. The population was 6 as of 2010.

== Geography ==
Beregovoy is located 20 km north of Sheksna (the district's administrative centre) by road. Myshkino is the nearest rural locality.
