= Beregovoy, Yenotayevsky District, Astrakhan Oblast =

Beregovoy Береговой
- Settlement
- Location within Astrakhan Oblast Location within Russia
- Coordinates: 46°53′N 47°32′E
- Country: Russia
- Region: Astrakhan Oblast
- District: Yenotayevsky District
- Time zone: UTC+4:00

Beregovoy (Russian: Береговой) is a rural locality (a settlement) in Srednevolzhsky Selsoviet of Yenotayevsky District, Astrakhan Oblast, Russia. The population was 105 as of 2010. There are 2 streets.

== Geography ==
Beregovoy is located 66 km southeast of Yenotayevka (the district's administrative centre) by road. Iki-Chibirsky is the nearest rural locality.
