= Beregovoye-Pervoye =

Beregovoye-Pervoye Береговое-Первое
- Selo
- Location within Belgorod Oblast Location within Russia
- Coordinates: 51°04′N 36°38′E
- Country: Russia
- Region: Belgorod Oblast
- District: Prokhorovsky District
- Time zone: UTC+3:00

Beregovoye-Pervoye (Russian: Береговое-Первое) is a rural locality (a selo) and the administrative center of Beregovskoye Rural Settlement, Prokhorovsky District, Belgorod Oblast, Russia. The population was 318 as of 2010. There are 6 streets.

== Geography ==
Beregovoye-Pervoye is located 11 km northwest of Prokhorovka (the district's administrative centre) by road. Beregovoye-Vtoroye is the nearest rural locality.
