= Beregovoy, Volodarsky District, Astrakhan Oblast =

Beregovoy Береговой
- Settlement
- Location within Astrakhan Oblast Location within Russia
- Coordinates: 46°16′N 48°27′E
- Country: Russia
- Region: Astrakhan Oblast
- District: Volodarsky District
- Time zone: UTC+4:00

Beregovoy (Russian: Береговой) is a rural locality (a settlement) in Sultanovsky Selsoviet of Volodarsky District, Astrakhan Oblast, Russia. The population was 163 as of 2010. There is 1 street.

== Geography ==
Beregovoy is located 37 km (23 mi) southwest of Volodarsky (the district's administrative centre) by road. Nizhnyaya Sultanovka is the nearest rural locality.
