= Yevgeny Khrunov =

Soviet cosmonaut (1933–2000)

- Евгений Хрунов
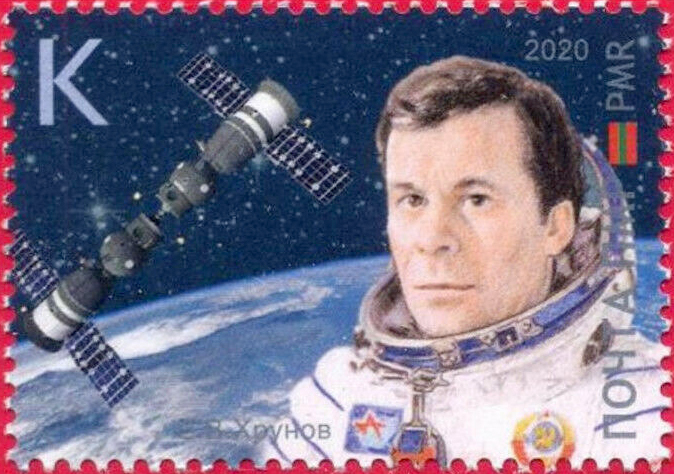
- Born: 10 September 1933; Tula Oblast, USSR
- Died: 20 May 2000 (aged 66); Moscow, Russia
- Occupation: Engineer
- Awards: Hero of the Soviet Union; Order of Lenin
- Space career

Cosmonaut
- Rank: Colonel, Soviet Air Force
- Time in space: 1d 23h 45m
- Selection: Air Force Group 1
- Total EVAs: 1
- Total EVA time: 37m
- Missions: Soyuz 5, Soyuz 4

Yevgeny Vasilyevich Khrunov (Russian: Евге́ний Васи́льевич Хруно́в; 10 September 1933 – 20 May 2000) was a Soviet cosmonaut who flew on the Soyuz 5/Soyuz 4 mission.

== Early life ==
Yevgeny Khrunov was born on 10 September 1933 to Vasily Yegorevich and Agrafena Nikolayevna. Nicknamed "Zhenya", he had five brothers and two sisters. Khrunov's family was a farming family. Khrunov married Svetlana Sokolyuk and had a son on 13 July 1959.

He was born in Prudy, Tula Oblast, Russian SFSR.

== Education and career ==
Khrunov began officially being schooled in 1941. He was initially interested in pursuing farming in studies. His interest in flying would soon follow after he watched the planes during wartime. Once he graduated from primary school he enrolled at Kashira Agricultural Secondary School on scholarship and would graduate from there in 1952. His teachers regularly spoke highly of him and considered him a hard working student. In 1952 Khrunov was also drafted into the Soviet Army where he would follow his interests in becoming a pilot and apply for pilot school. Khrunov was accepted and continued school in the military at Pavlograd in Ukraine. Khrunov later transferred to the Serov Higher Air Force School in Rostov Oblast, Southwestern Russia. Upon graduation he would receive the rank of Lieutenant. Khrunov later received another promotion to senior lieutenant on 6 August 1958. The following year Khrunov was interviewed along with Gorbatko in regards to becoming a cosmonaut although they were not expressly told that was what they were being interviewed for. Both Gorbatko and Khrunov were evaluated in medical exams and approved for training to become cosmonauts.

== Awards ==
- Hero of the Soviet Union
- Pilot-Cosmonaut of the USSR
- Order of Lenin
- Order of the Red Star
- Jubilee Medal "In Commemoration of the 100th Anniversary since the Birth of Vladimir Il'ich Lenin"
- Jubilee Medal "Twenty Years of Victory in the Great Patriotic War 1941-1945"
- Jubilee Medal "40 Years of the Armed Forces of the USSR"
- Jubilee Medal "50 Years of the Armed Forces of the USSR"
- Jubilee Medal "60 Years of the Armed Forces of the USSR"
- Medals "For Impeccable Service" 1st, 2nd and 3rd classes
- Jubilee Medal "50 Years of the Soviet Militia"
- Medal "For Strengthening Military Cooperation"

== Later life ==
After leaving the space program in 1980 he worked at the 30th Central Scientific Research Institute, Ministry of Defence (Russia), and later he was appointed to the Chief State Committee for foreign economic relations until his retirement in 1989.

He died of a heart attack on 20 May 2000 at the age of 66.
