= Soyuz 3 =

Crewed flight of the Soyuz programme

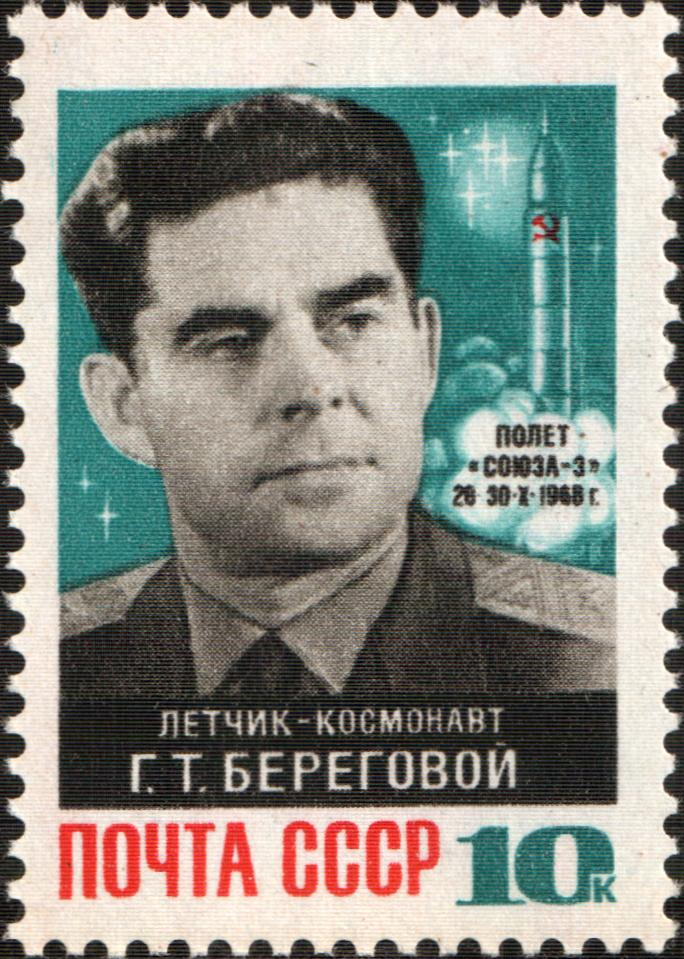
- Soyuz 3 commemorative postage stamp, USSR, 1968
- Mission type: Test flight
- Operator: Soviet space program
- COSPAR ID: 1968-094A
- SATCAT no.: 03516
- Mission duration: 3 days 22 hours 50 minutes 45 seconds
- Orbits completed: 81

Spacecraft properties
- Spacecraft: Soyuz 7K-OK No.10
- Spacecraft type: Soyuz 7K-OK (active)
- Manufacturer: Experimental Design Bureau (OKB-1)
- Launch mass: 6575 kg
- Landing mass: 2800 kg
- Dimensions: 7.13 m long 2.72 m wide

Crew
- Crew size: 1
- Members: Georgy Beregovoy
- Callsign: Аргон (Argon - "Argon")

Start of mission
- Launch date: 26 October 1968, 08:34:18 GMT
- Rocket: Soyuz
- Launch site: Baikonur, Site 31/6

End of mission
- Landing date: 30 October 1968, 07:25:03 GMT
- Landing site: Karaganda, Kazakhstan

Orbital parameters
- Reference system: Geocentric orbit
- Regime: Low Earth orbit
- Perigee altitude: 196.0 km
- Apogee altitude: 241.0 km
- Inclination: 51.66°
- Period: 88.87 minutes
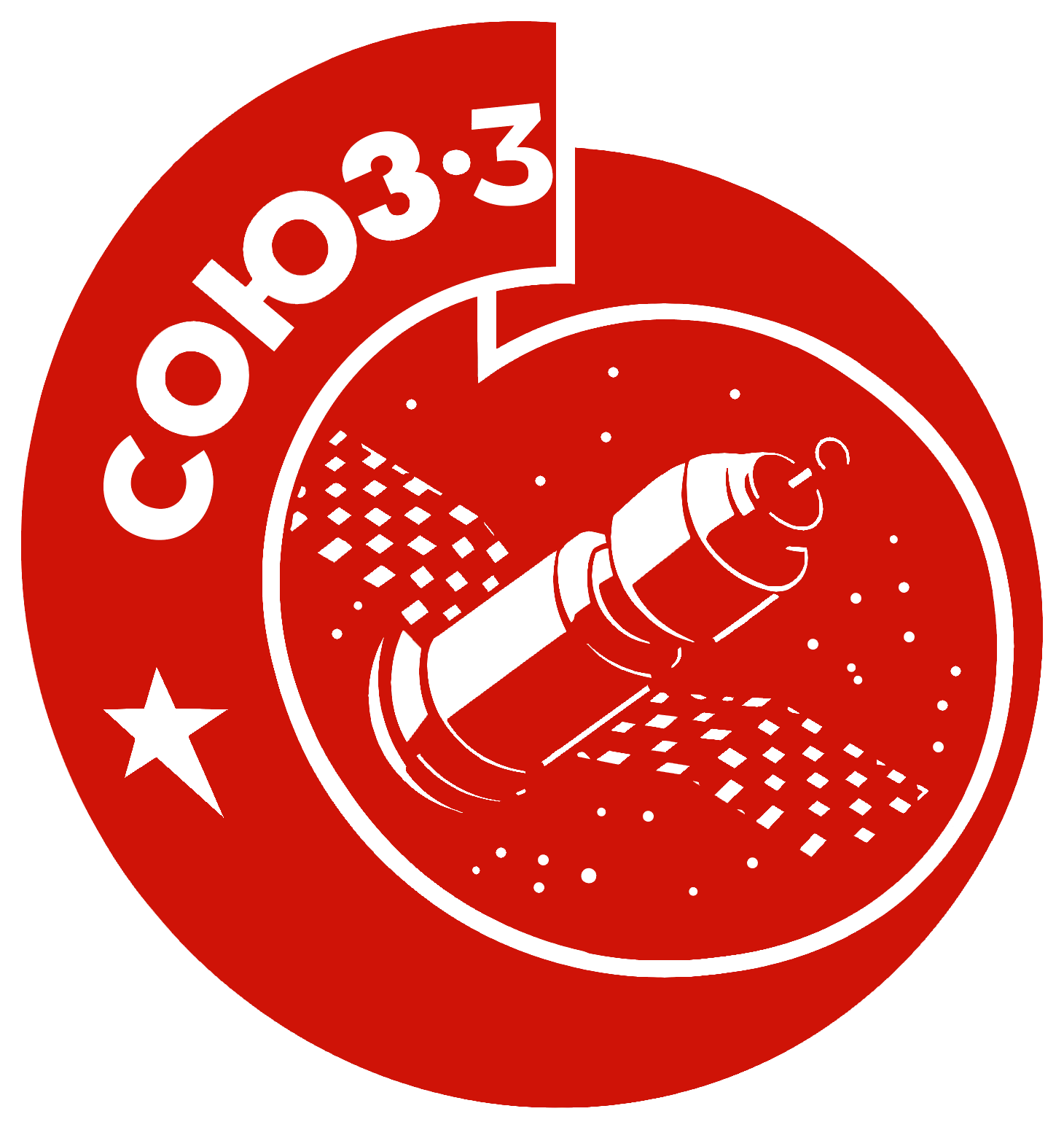
- Soyuz 3 mission patch Soyuz programme

Soyuz 3 (Russian: Союз 3, Union 3) was a spaceflight mission launched by the Soviet Union on 26 October 1968. Flown by Georgy Beregovoy, the Soyuz 7K-OK spacecraft completed 81 orbits over four days. The 47-year-old Beregovoy was a decorated World War II flying ace and the oldest person to go into orbit up to that time. The mission achieved the first Russian space rendezvous with the uncrewed Soyuz 2, but failed to achieve a planned docking of the two craft. As of October 2025, this mission marks the last time a Soviet/Russian cosmonaut was launched alone to conduct an entirely solo orbital mission.

== Crew ==
Position	Cosmonaut
Pilot	Georgy Beregovoy; Only spaceflight

=== Backup crew ===
Position	Cosmonaut
Pilot	Vladimir Shatalov

=== Reserve crew ===
Position	Cosmonaut
Pilot	Boris Volynov

== Mission parameters ==
- Mass: 6,575 kg (14,495 lb)
- Perigee: 196.0 km (121.8 mi)
- Apogee: 241.0 km (149.8 mi)
- Inclination: 51.66°
- Period: 88.87 minutes

== Background ==
The Soviet space program had experienced great success in its early years, but by the mid-1960s the pace of success had slowed. While the Voskhod programme achieved the first multi-crewed spaceflight and first extravehicular activity (EVA), problems encountered led to its termination after only two flights, allowing the United States to surpass the Soviet achievements with the Project Gemini. The Soyuz programme was intended to rejuvenate the program by developing space rendezvous and docking capability, and practical extravehicular activity without tiring the cosmonaut, as had been demonstrated by the United States Gemini. These capabilities would be required for the Soviet manned Lunar landing program and the Salyut programme (space station). Soyuz 1 had been launched with the goal of docking with the crewed Soyuz 2 craft, but even before the second craft was launched, problems with Soyuz 1 made it clear that Soyuz 2 had to be cancelled before the landing of Soyuz 1. This saved the lives of the three-man Soyuz 2 crew; Soyuz 1 ended with the death of cosmonaut Vladimir Komarov on 23 April 1967, due to a faulty parachute system. Soyuz 2 would have flown with the same defective system as Soyuz 1. As a result, the Soyuz spacecraft was revised for Soyuz 2 and Soyuz 3 in 1968.

== Spaceflight ==
Soyuz 2 (capsule number 7K-OK-P No. 11) was launched on 25 October 1968 as an uncrewed target vehicle for Soyuz 3 (capsule number 7K-OK-P No. 10), which was launched the following day. The launch of Soyuz 2 was not reported by the government, although other nations were aware through their own monitors. It was not until Soyuz 3 was safely aloft that an official announcement was made.

The more conservative mission used Beregovoy as the single pilot, with Vladimir Shatalov designated as his backup, and Boris Volynov in reserve. Entering orbit and near Soyuz 2 a half-hour after launch, Beregovoy gradually guided his craft within docking range (200 m (660 ft)) of his target.

However, Beregovoy failed to achieve docking. He failed to notice that Soyuz 2 was turned upside-down in relation to his craft, and used up too much of his maneuvering fuel in the attempt.

He made a second rendezvous and docking attempt the next day, but again failed. Hours later, Soyuz 2 was sent back to Earth and landed by 07:51 GMT the next day. Beregovoy continued to orbit, making topographical and meteorological observations for the next two days. Beregovoy also treated television viewers to a "live" tour of the spacecraft interior. In addition, the Soviets published a photo of Soyuz 3's launch vehicle on the pad at Baikonur, marking the first time that the R-7 was shown to the outside world.

== Return ==
Beregovoy and Soyuz 3 came back to Earth on 30 October 1968, after completing 81 full orbits of the Earth. The descent module landed near the city of Karaganda in Kazakhstan, cushioned by a blizzard's snowfall. Despite subzero temperatures, Beregovoy's landing was so easy he said later that he hardly felt the impact at all. The Soviets hailed Soyuz 3 as a complete success. Beregovoy was promoted to Major general and named director of the national Center for Cosmonaut Training at Star City.

== Soviet disingenuousness ==
The Soviet government concealed the fact that docking had been unsuccessfully attempted. Contemporary Western news reports described the orbital mission of Soyuz 3 in the same manner as the Soviet press, referring to a "successful rendezvous" with Soyuz 2, but characterizing it as a test with no actual ship-to-ship docking planned. This interpretation was largely accepted for years afterward. The intended docking was disclosed only after the breakup of the Soviet Union.

== Legacy ==
The flight of Soyuz 3 had numerous effects on future space exploration both short- and long-term. The flawless recovery of Soyuz 3 left the spacecraft designers with the impression that re-entry and landing systems had been perfected: the crash-landing of the Zond 6 satellite just one month later had been partly attributed to this mistaken sense of security. The value of the outer space survey of Earth was a defining step in the development of the Soyuz program's grand strategy: the later evolution of space-based research platforms have roots in Beregovoy's lengthy and meticulous data-collection. Even the failure of the space docking proved an experiential benefit to the Soviet space program: after the demoralizing catastrophe of Soyuz 1, the credible achievements and safe return of Soyuz 3 breathed new life into the faltering program. New flights continued apace, and they put the knowledge gained from Soyuz 3 towards missions of increasing audacity and success.
