= Georgy Beregovoy =

Soviet cosmonaut (1921–1995)

- Георгий Береговой (Russian); Георгій Береговий (Ukrainian)
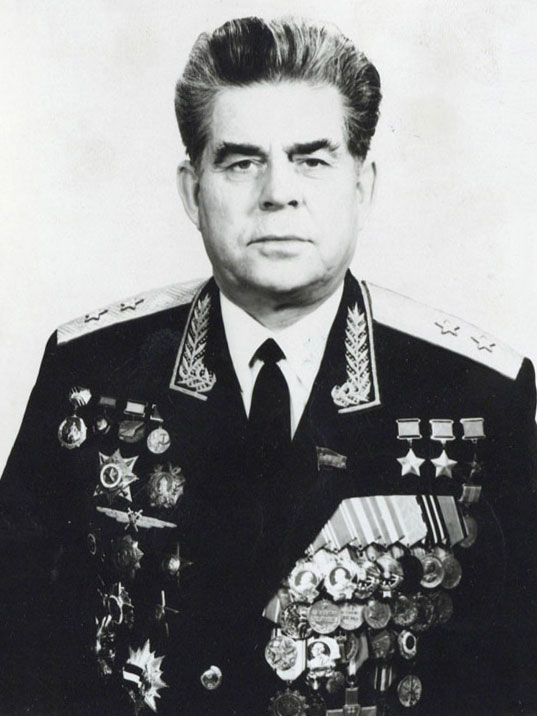
- Born: 15 April 1921; Fedorivka, Poltava Oblast, Ukrainian SSR, Soviet Union
- Died: 30 June 1995 (aged 74); Moscow, Russia
- Occupation: Pilot
- Awards: Hero of the Soviet Union (twice)
- Space career

Cosmonaut
- Rank: Lieutenant General, Soviet Air Forces (1938–1987)
- Time in space: 3d 22h 50m
- Selection: 1962
- Missions: Soyuz 3
- Retired: 1987

Georgy Timofeyevich Beregovoy (Russian: Георгий Тимофеевич Береговой, Ukrainian: Георгій Тимофійович Береговий, romanized: Heorhiy Tymofiyovych Berehovyi; 15 April 1921 – 30 June 1995) was a Soviet cosmonaut who commanded the space mission Soyuz 3 in 1968. From 1972 to 1987, he headed the Yuri Gagarin Cosmonaut Training Center.

At the time of his space flight, Beregovoy was 47 years of age: he was the earliest-born human to go to orbit, being born three months and three days earlier than the second earliest-born man in orbit – John Glenn, but later than X-15 pilot Joe Walker who made 2 (or 3, according to USAF definition) suborbital space flights.

== Background ==
Beregovoy was born on 15 April 1921 in Fedorivka, Poltava Oblast, Ukrainian Soviet Socialist Republic (now Ukraine). His father worked as a telegraph operator on the railways. He had two older brothers; the eldest, Viktor, also became a pilot and the younger, Mikhail, an officer in the Soviet Air Defence Forces. Viktor was caught in the Great Purge of the late 1930s, and was arrested and executed in 1938. He was subsequently rehabilitated. Georgy graduated from a school in 1938 at Yenakiieve in the Stalino Oblast of the Ukrainian SSR. He joined the Soviet Air Forces (VVS) in 1941, and was soon assigned to a ground-attack unit flying the Ilyushin Il-2 "Shturmovik". He flew some 185 combat sorties during the course of World War II and rose quickly through the ranks, finishing the war as a captain and squadron commander. His corps commander was then-colonel Nikolai Kamanin, a celebrated polar aviator and a future head of the cosmonaut training in the Soviet space program, which would turn important later.

Following the war, he became a test pilot, and over the next sixteen years test-flew some sixty different aircraft, rising to the rank of colonel and the position of deputy chief of the air force's flight-testing department. In 1962, he applied and was accepted for cosmonaut training, sponsored by his former WWII commander, General Kamanin, who was the head of the cosmonaut training at the time.

In 1956 he graduated from the Air Force Academy.

== Cosmonaut career ==
In 1965, Colonel Beregovoy was scheduled to fly the following year in Voskhod 3, but the mission was never launched.

On 25 October 1968 Beregovoy took the Soyuz 3 into outer space: he orbited the Earth for almost four days at an altitude of up to 252 km. As part of his mission, Beregovoy twice maneuvered his craft into rendezvous positions with the uncrewed Soyuz 2 satellite but was unable to establish a direct physical link to the craft before returning on 30 October 1968.

Nonetheless, Beregovoy's flight was in some ways an encouraging success for the Soviet crewed space program, and the colonel was celebrated as a hero upon his return. Soyuz 3 was Beregovoy's only spaceflight and soon after it he retired from active duty, having been promoted to Major General.

== Later life ==
At a public ceremony in honor of the Soviet cosmonaut team, Beregovoy was lightly wounded during the 1969 assassination attempt upon Leonid Brezhnev.

In October 1969, Konstantin Feoktistov and Georgi Beregovoi traveled as guests of NASA throughout the US, visiting any city they chose and the Disneyland amusement park in California - they were joined on the trip by US astronauts as hosts, including Eugene Cernan, Neil Armstrong and others. Kirk Douglas and others hosted receptions for them in Hollywood - they were protected by Special Agents of the US State Department on request of NASA. Almost every place they went when accompanied by Eugene Cernan, if a band was present the song "Fly Me To The moon" was played - when they visited Disney Park they enjoyed the ride Trip To The Moon, then joked with the US Astronauts that they went to Disneyland and not the moon. It was a trip that all enjoyed and international friendships were made.

Beregovoy took up a position at the Centre for Cosmonaut Training, and in 1972 was made Director of that facility.

He is a consultant for the film directed by Arvazd Peleshyan "Our Century" (1983).

After retirement, Beregovoy became a Soviet parliament member representing the Donbas region of the Ukrainian SSR. In this capacity, he reportedly helped Viktor Yanukovych to start a new life, getting his two criminal convictions expunged from the court records. Many years later, Yanukovych became prime minister and then president of modern independent Ukraine.

Georgy Beregovoy died during heart surgery on 30 June 1995, and is buried in the Novodevichy Cemetery in Moscow.

== Honours and awards ==
Beregovoy was awarded the title of the Hero of the Soviet Union twice, the first time on 26 October 1944, for his military service during World War II, and a second time for his space flight. He was the only Soviet cosmonaut who undertook space flight being the Hero of the Soviet Union (the highest Soviet distinction) for a previous achievement unrelated to space travel.

He was also awarded:

- Title Pilot-Cosmonaut of the USSR,
- Two Orders of Lenin (1944 and 1968)
- Two Orders of the Red Banner
- Order of Alexander Nevsky,
- Order of Bogdan Khmelnitsky, 3rd class,
- Order of the Patriotic War, 1st class, twice
- Two Orders of the Red Star,
- Order for Service to the Homeland in the Armed Forces of the USSR, 3rd class,
- Medal for Battle Merit, 1949
- Medal "For Impeccable Service", 1st class
- USSR State Prize (1981)
- Medal "For the Victory over Germany in the Great Patriotic War 1941–1945"
- Medal "For the Capture of Budapest"
- Medal "For the Capture of Vienna"
- Jubilee Medal "In Commemoration of the 100th Anniversary since the Birth of Vladimir Il'ich Lenin"
- Jubilee Medal "Twenty Years of Victory in the Great Patriotic War 1941-1945"
- Jubilee Medal "30 Years of the Soviet Army and Navy"
- Jubilee Medal "40 Years of the Armed Forces of the USSR"
- Jubilee Medal "50 Years of the Armed Forces of the USSR"
- Gold medal of the Tsiolkovsky Academy of Sciences of the USSR

Foreign awards:

Bulgaria

- Hero of Socialist Labour (1970)
- Order of Georgi Dimitrov (1970)
- Order of the Banner of the People's Republic of Bulgaria
- Medal "25 Years of People's Power"
- Medal "100th anniversary of the fall of the Ottoman yoke" (1979)
- Medal "100th Anniversary of Birth of Georgi Dimitrov" (1983)

Hungary

- Order of the National Flag (1985)
- Order of the Red Banner, with Diamonds
- Gold Medal "for military cooperation" (1980)

Other

- Cross of Grunwald, 3rd class (People's Republic of Poland)
- Order of the Tudor Vladimirescu, 5th class (CPP)
- Yuri Gagarin Gold Medal (Fédération Aéronautique Internationale)

Among many other Russian commemorations, Beregovoy is memorialized in Moscow with a statue on Cosmonauts Alley. Beregovoy was celebrated internationally and received a unique award from the International Aeronautical Federation. At the Federation's 62nd general conference held in Helsinki, Finland, Beregovoy was awarded the first Yuri A. Gagarin Gold Medal for achievements in space; Finnish President Urho Kekkonen was the honorary presenter on July 14, 1968. The award was a new design created in memory of Gagarin who had died the previous March, and it continues to be awarded to this day.

== See also ==
- Soyuz programme
- Soviet space program
- the official website of the city administration Baikonur - Honorary citizens of Baikonur
