= Space suit =

Garment worn to protect a human in space

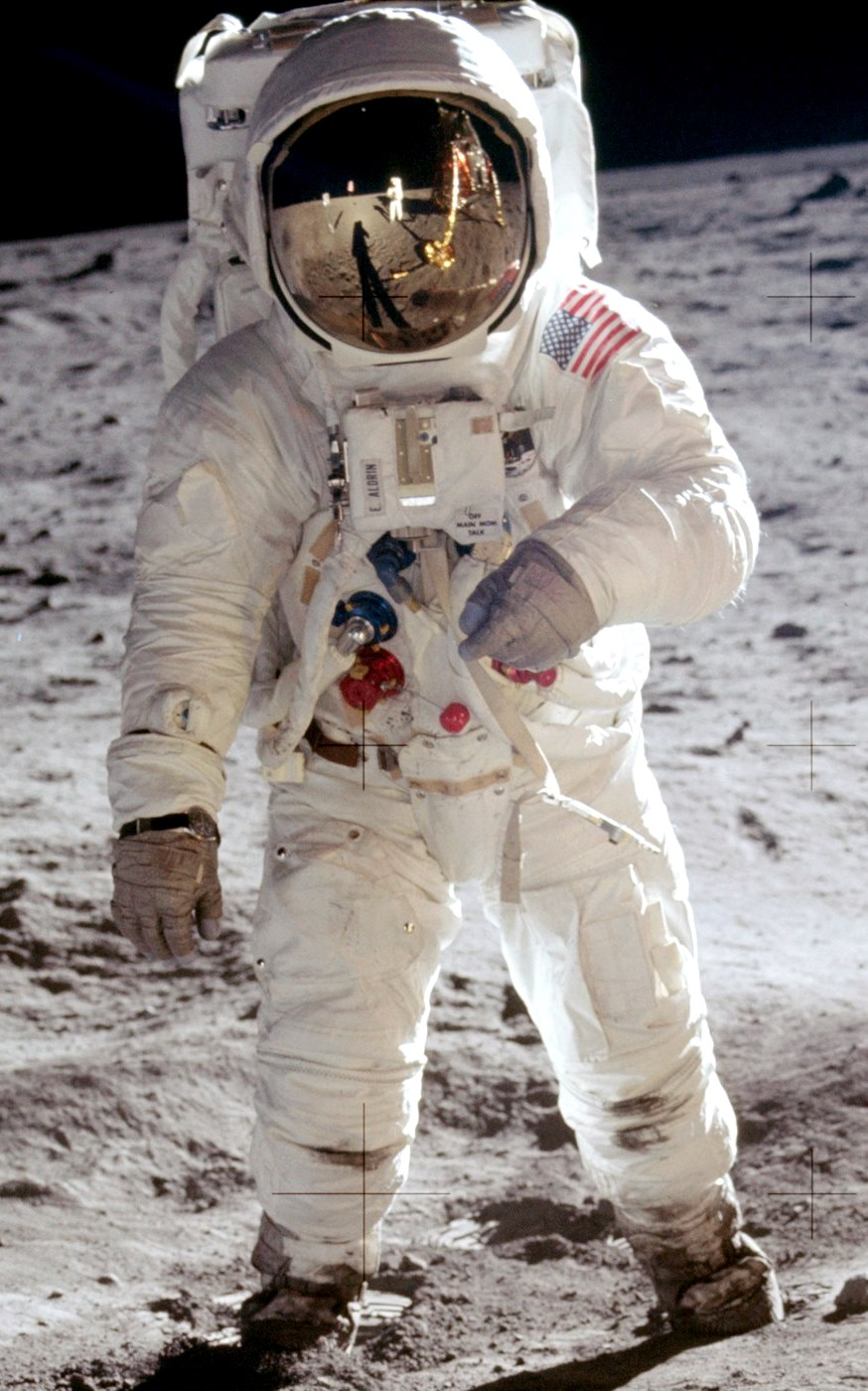
Apollo spacesuit worn by astronaut Buzz Aldrin on Apollo 11

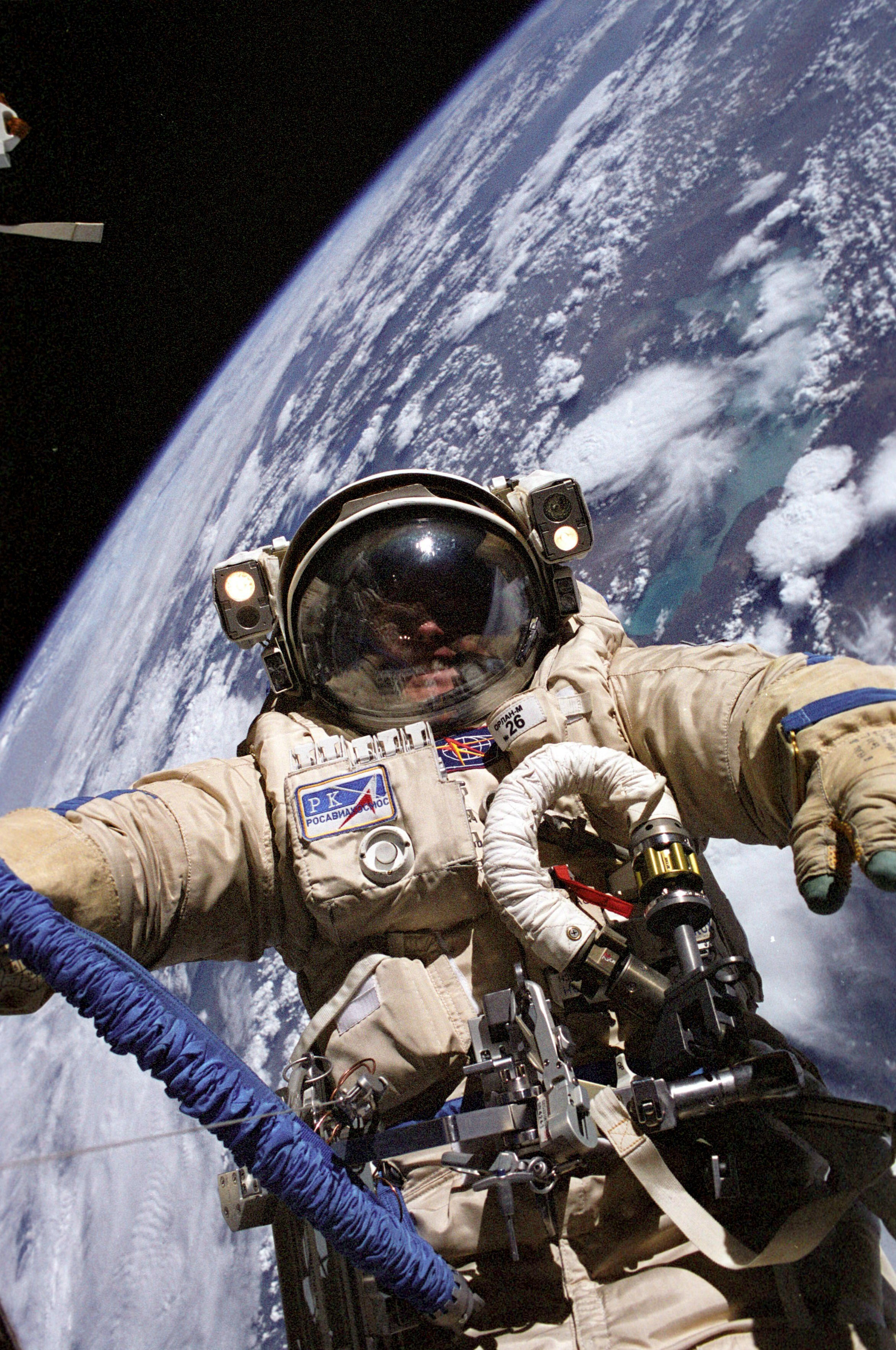
Orlan space suit worn by astronaut Michael Fincke outside the International Space Station

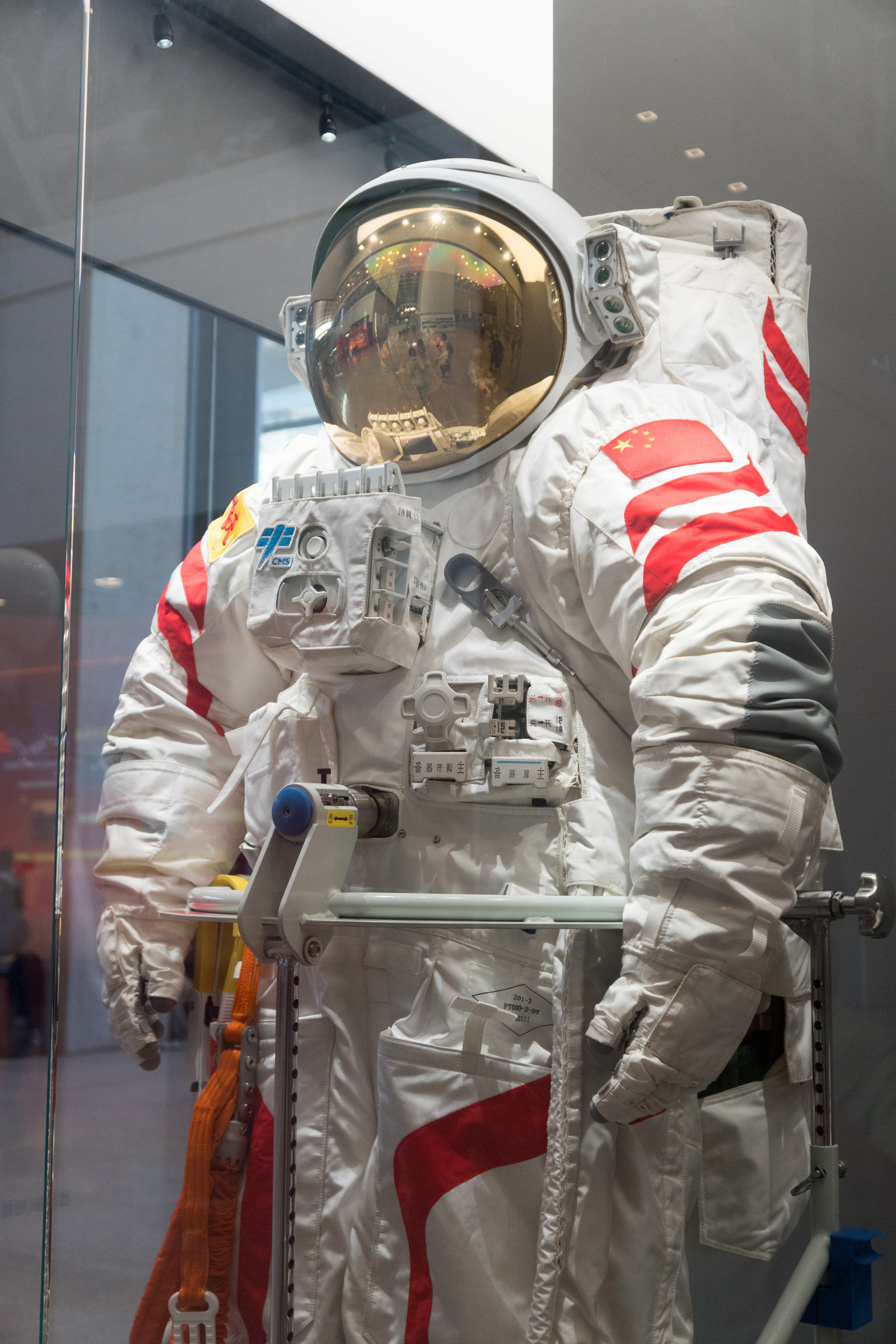
Feitian space suit being displayed at the National Museum of China

A space suit (or spacesuit) is an environmental suit used for protection from the harsh environment of outer space. It mainly protects from outer space’s vacuum, as space suits are a highly specialized pressure suit, but it also protects against temperature extremes, as well as radiation and micrometeoroids. Basic space suits are worn as a safety precaution inside spacecrafts in case of loss of cabin pressure. For extravehicular activity (EVA), more complex space suits are worn, featuring a portable life support system.

Pressure suits are, in general, needed at low pressure environments above the Armstrong limit, at around 19,000 m (62,000 ft) above Earth. Space suits augment pressure suits with a complex system of equipment and environmental systems designed to keep the wearer comfortable, and to minimize the effort required to bend the limbs, resisting a soft pressure garment's natural tendency to stiffen against the vacuum. A self-contained oxygen supply and environmental control system is frequently employed to allow complete freedom of movement, independent of the spacecraft.

Three types of space suits exist for different purposes: IVA (intravehicular activity), EVA (extravehicular activity), and IEVA (intra/extravehicular activity). IVA suits are meant to be worn inside a pressurized spacecraft, and are therefore lighter and more comfortable. IEVA suits are meant for use inside and outside the spacecraft, such as the Gemini G4C suit. They include more protection from the harsh conditions of space, such as protection from micrometeoroids and extreme temperature change. EVA suits, such as the EMU, are used outside spacecraft, for either planetary exploration or spacewalks. They must protect the wearer against all conditions of space, as well as provide mobility and functionality.

The first full-pressure suits for use at extreme altitudes were designed by individual inventors as early as the 1930s. The first space suit worn by a human in space was the Soviet SK-1 suit worn by Yuri Gagarin in 1961. Since then space suits have been worn beside in Earth orbit, en-route and on the surface of the Moon.

== Requirements ==
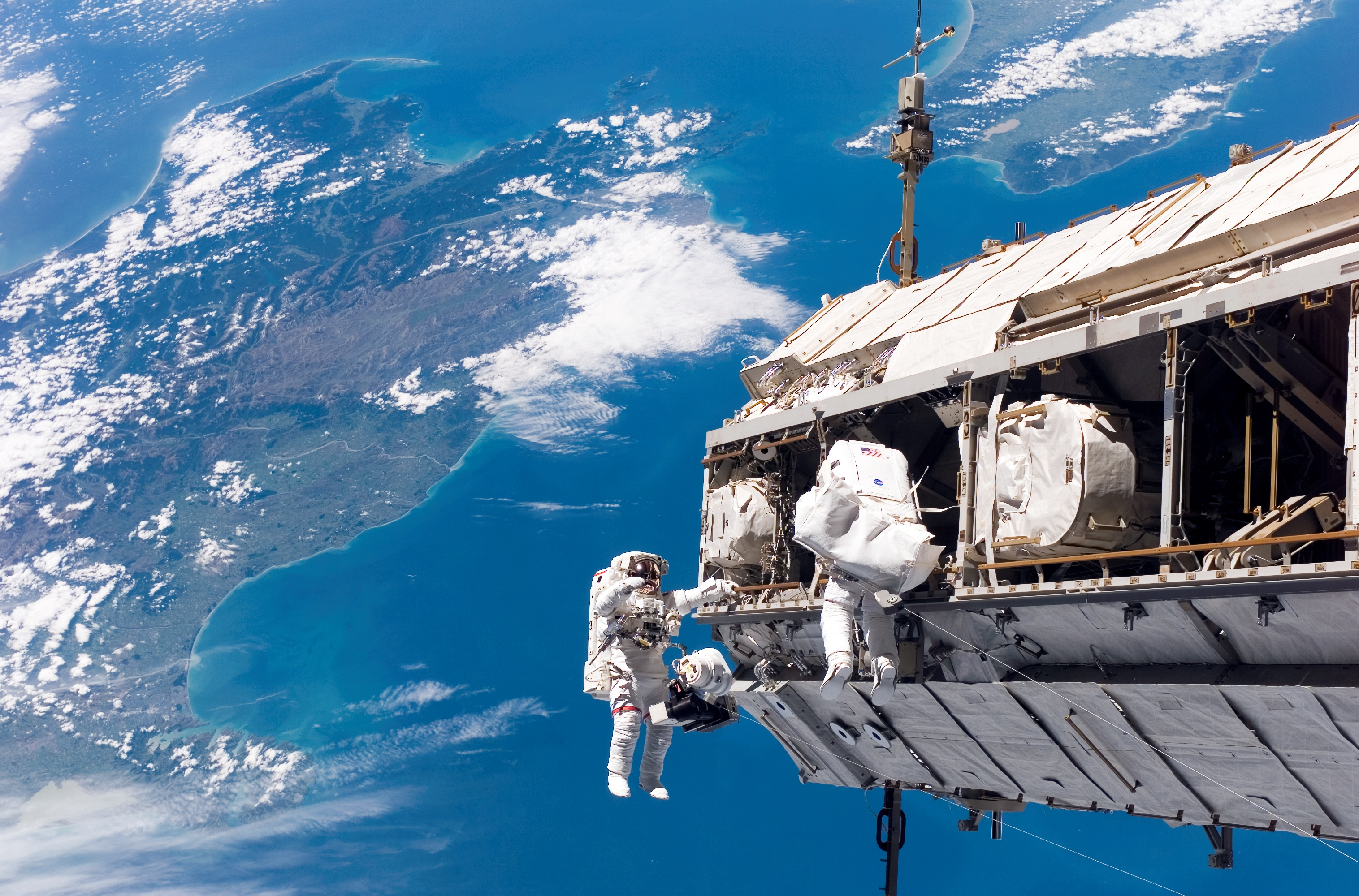
Space suits being used to work on the International Space Station.

A space suit must perform several functions to allow its occupant to work safely and comfortably, inside or outside a spacecraft. It must provide:

- A stable internal pressure. This can be less than Earth's atmosphere, as there is usually no need for the space suit to carry nitrogen (which comprises about 78% of Earth's atmosphere and is not used by the body). Lower pressure allows for greater mobility, but requires the suit occupant to breathe pure oxygen for a time before going into this lower pressure, to avoid decompression sickness.
- Mobility. Movement is typically opposed by the pressure of the suit; mobility is achieved by careful joint design. See the Design concepts section.
- Supply of breathable oxygen and elimination of carbon dioxide; these gases are exchanged with the spacecraft or a Portable Life Support System (PLSS)
- Temperature regulation. Unlike on Earth, where heat can be transferred by convection to the atmosphere, in space, heat can be lost only by thermal radiation or by conduction to objects in physical contact with the exterior of the suit. Since the temperature on the outside of the suit varies greatly between sunlight and shadow, the suit is heavily insulated, and air temperature is maintained at a comfortable level.
- A communication system, with external electrical connection to the spacecraft or PLSS
- Means of collecting and containing solid and liquid bodily waste (such as a Maximum Absorbency Garment)

=== Secondary requirements ===
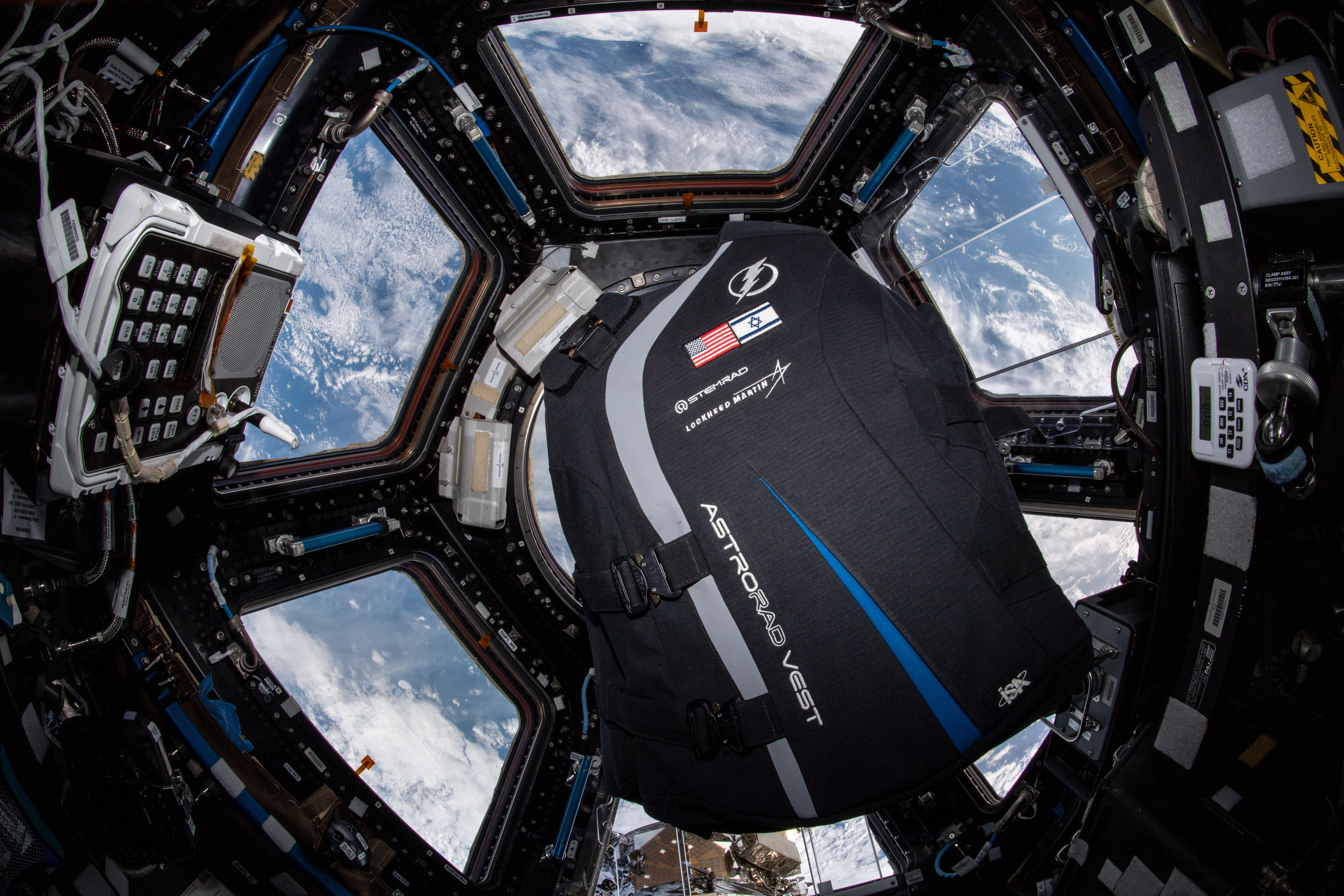
AstroRad developed by Israeli StemRad anti Radiation spacesuit

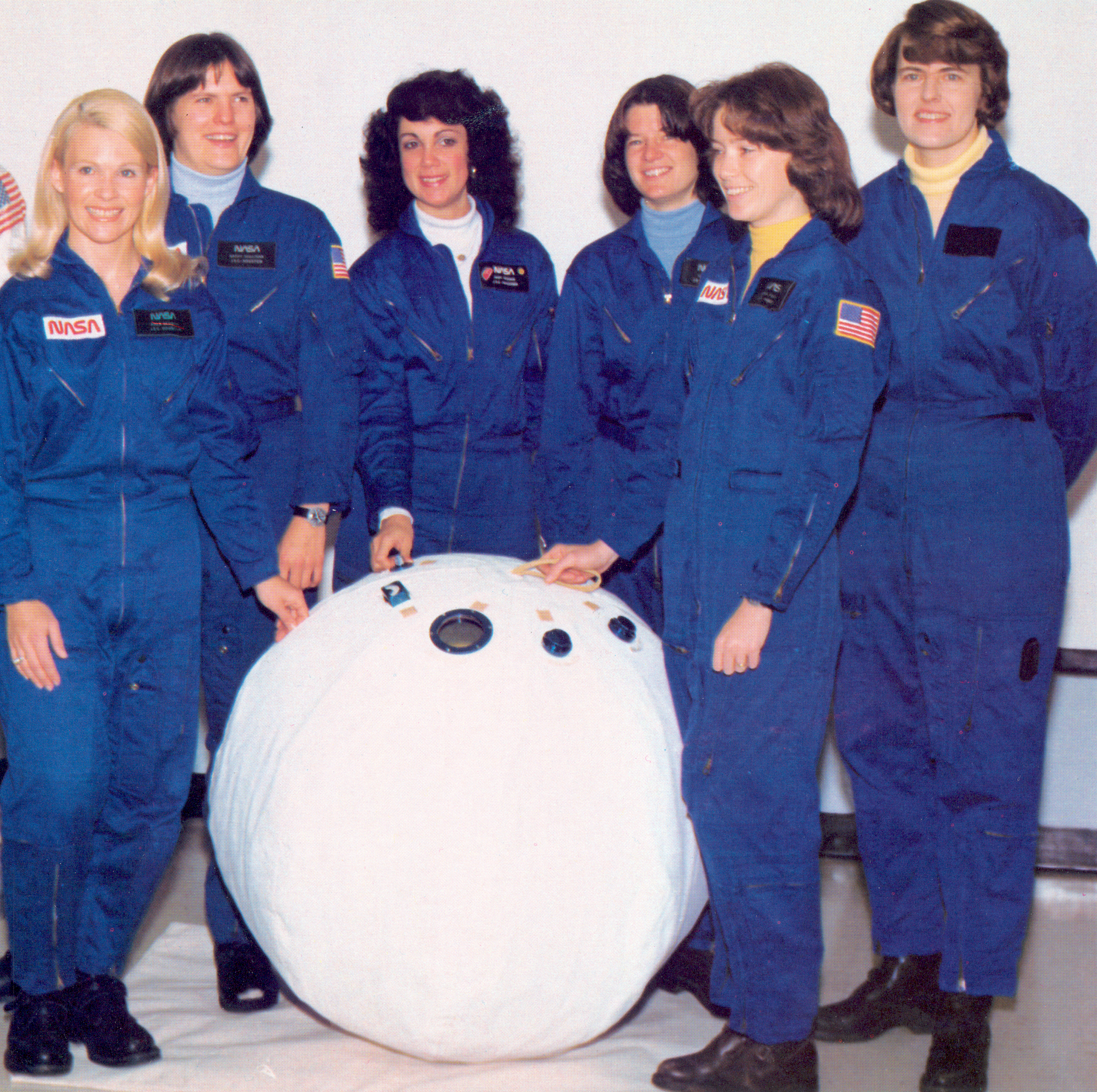
From left to right, Margaret R. (Rhea) Seddon, Kathryn D. Sullivan, Judith A. Resnick, Sally K. Ride, Anna L. Fisher, and Shannon W. Lucid—The first six female astronauts of the United States stand with a Personal Rescue Enclosure, a spherical life support ball for emergency transfer of people in space

Advanced suits better regulate the astronaut's temperature with a Liquid Cooling and Ventilation Garment (LCVG) in contact with the astronaut's skin, from which the heat is dumped into space through an external radiator in the PLSS.

Additional requirements for EVA include:

- Shielding against ultraviolet radiation
- Limited shielding against particle radiation
- Means to maneuver, dock, release, and tether onto a spacecraft
- Protection against small micrometeoroids, some traveling at up to 27,000 kilometers per hour, provided by a puncture-resistant Thermal Micrometeoroid Garment, which is the outermost layer of the suit. Experience has shown the greatest chance of exposure occurs near the gravitational field of a moon or planet, so these were first employed on the Apollo lunar EVA suits (see United States suit models below).

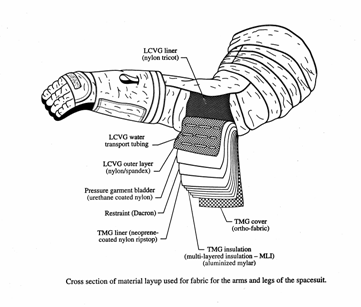
Layers of a space suit

As part of astronautical hygiene control (i.e., protecting astronauts from extremes of temperature, radiation, etc.), a space suit is essential for extravehicular activity. The Apollo/Skylab A7L suit included eleven layers in all: an inner liner, a LCVG, a pressure bladder, a restraint layer, another liner, and a Thermal Micrometeoroid Garment consisting of five aluminized insulation layers and an external layer of white Ortho-Fabric. This space suit is capable of protecting the astronaut from temperatures ranging from −156 °C (−249 °F) to 121 °C (250 °F).

During exploration of the Moon or Mars, there will be the potential for lunar or Martian dust to be retained on the space suit. When the space suit is removed on return to the spacecraft, there will be the potential for the dust to contaminate surfaces and increase the risks of inhalation and skin exposure. Astronautical hygienists are testing materials with reduced dust retention times and the potential to control the dust exposure risks during planetary exploration. Novel ingress and egress approaches, such as suitports, are being explored as well.

In NASA space suits, communications are provided via a cap worn over the head, which includes earphones and a microphone. Due to the coloration of the version used for Apollo and Skylab, which resembled the coloration of the comic strip character Snoopy, these caps became known as "Snoopy caps".

=== Operating pressure ===
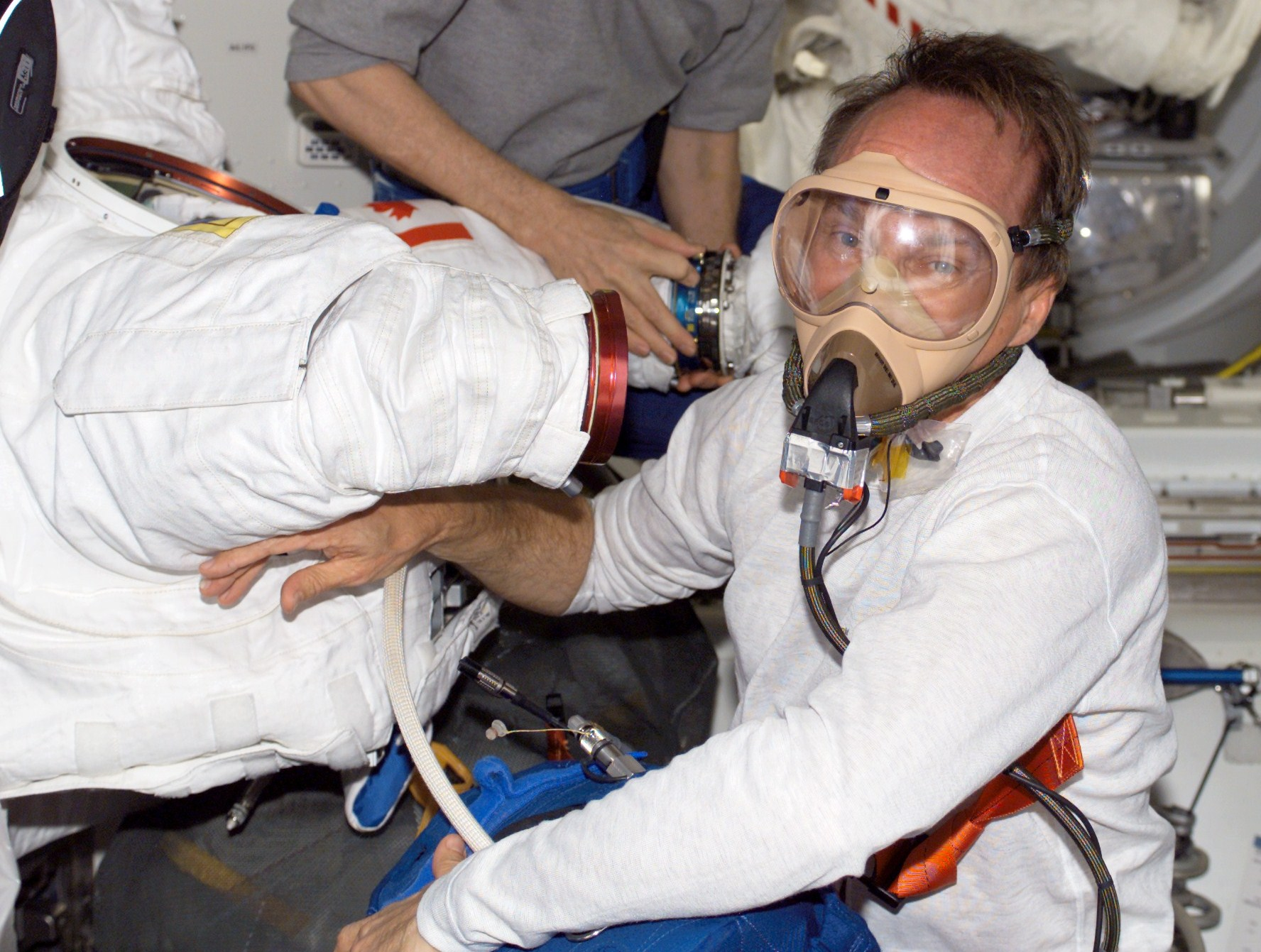
Astronaut Steven G. MacLean pre-breathes prior to an EVA

Generally, to supply enough oxygen for respiration, a space suit using pure oxygen must have a pressure of about 32.4 kPa (240 Torr; 4.7 psi), equal to the 20.7 kPa (160 Torr; 3.0 psi) partial pressure of oxygen in the Earth's atmosphere at sea level, plus 5.3 kPa (40 Torr; 0.77 psi) CO_{2} and 6.3 kPa (47 Torr; 0.91 psi) water vapor pressure, both of which must be subtracted from the alveolar pressure to get alveolar oxygen partial pressure in 100% oxygen atmospheres, by the alveolar gas equation. The latter two figures add to 11.6 kPa (87 Torr; 1.7 psi), which is why many modern space suits do not use 20.7 kPa (160 Torr; 3.0 psi), but 32.4 kPa (240 Torr; 4.7 psi) (this is a slight overcorrection, as alveolar partial pressures at sea level are slightly less than the former). In space suits that use 20.7 kPa, the astronaut gets only 20.7 kPa − 11.6 kPa = 9.1 kPa (68 Torr; 1.3 psi) of oxygen, which is about the alveolar oxygen partial pressure attained at an altitude of 1,860 m (6,100 ft) above sea level. This is about 42% of normal partial pressure of oxygen at sea level, about the same as pressure in a commercial passenger jet aircraft, and is the realistic lower limit for safe ordinary space suit pressurization which allows reasonable capacity for work.

==== Oxygen prebreathing ====
When space suits below a specific operating pressure are used from craft that are pressurized to normal atmospheric pressure (such as the Space Shuttle), this requires astronauts to "pre-breathe" (meaning pre-breathe pure oxygen for a period) before donning their suits and depressurizing in the air lock. This procedure purges the body of dissolved nitrogen, so as to avoid decompression sickness due to rapid depressurization from a nitrogen-containing atmosphere.

In the US space shuttle, cabin pressure was reduced from normal atmospheric to 70kPa (equivalent to an altitude of about 3000m) for 24 hours before EVA, and after donning the suit, a pre-breathing period of 45 minutes on pure oxygen before decompressing to the EMU working pressure of 30kPa. In the ISS there is no cabin pressure reduction, instead a 4-hour oxygen pre-breathe at normal cabin pressure is used to desaturate nitrogen to an acceptable level. US studies show that a rapid decompression from 101kPa to 55kPa has an acceptable risk, and Russian studies show that direct decompression from 101kPa to 40kPa after 30 minutes of oxygen pre-breathing, roughly the time required for pre-EVA suit checks, is acceptable.

=== Physiological effects of unprotected space exposure ===
The human body can briefly survive the hard vacuum of space unprotected, despite contrary depictions in some popular science fiction. Consciousness is retained for up to 15 seconds as the effects of oxygen starvation set in. No snap freeze effect occurs because all heat must be lost through thermal radiation or the evaporation of liquids, and the blood does not boil because it remains pressurized within the body, but human flesh expands up to about twice its volume due to ebullism in such conditions, giving the visual effect of a body builder rather than an overfilled balloon.

In space, there are highly energized subatomic particles that can cause radiation damage by disrupting essential biological processes. Exposure to radiation can create problems via two methods: the particles can react with water in the human body to produce free radicals that break DNA molecules apart, or by directly breaking the DNA molecules.

Temperature in space can vary extremely depending on the exposure to radiant energy sources. Temperatures from solar radiation can reach up to 250 °F (121 °C), and in its absence, down to −387 °F (−233 °C). Because of this, space suits must provide sufficient insulation and cooling for the conditions in which they will be used.

The vacuum environment of space has no pressure, so gases will expand and exposed liquids may evaporate. Some solids may sublimate. It is necessary to wear a suit that provides sufficient internal body pressure in space. The most immediate hazard is in attempting to hold one's breath during explosive decompression as the expansion of gas can damage the lungs by overexpansion rupture. These effects have been confirmed through various accidents (including in very-high-altitude conditions, outer space and training vacuum chambers). Human skin does not need to be protected from vacuum and is gas-tight by itself. It only needs to be mechanically restrained to retain its normal shape and the internal tissues to retain their volume. This can be accomplished with a tight-fitting elastic body suit and a helmet for containing breathing gases, known as a space activity suit (SAS).

== Design concepts ==
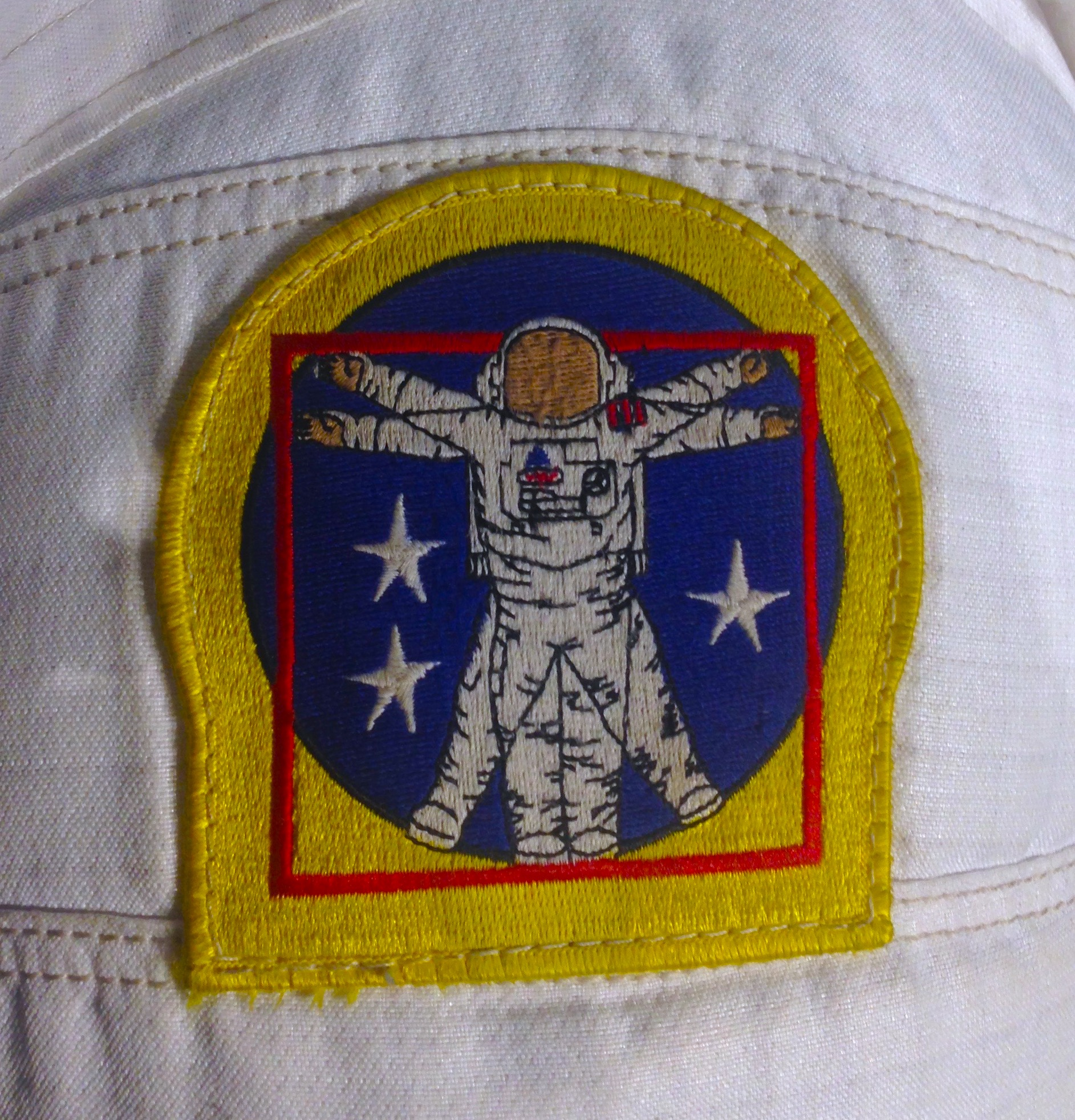
NASA's Extravehicular Mobility Unit Vitruvian Spaceman patch (Space Shuttle version, with three stars representing NASA's human spaceflight programs)

A space suit should allow its user natural unencumbered movement. Nearly all designs try to maintain a constant volume no matter what movements the wearer makes. This is because mechanical work is needed to change the volume of a constant pressure system. If flexing a joint reduces the volume of the space suit, then the astronaut must do extra work every time they bend that joint, and they have to maintain a force to keep the joint bent. Even if this force is very small, it can be seriously fatiguing to constantly fight against one's suit. It also makes delicate movements very difficult. The work required to bend a joint is dictated by the formula

$$W=\int_{V_i}^{V_f} \,P\,dV$$

where V_{i} and V_{f} are respectively the initial and final volume of the joint, P is the pressure in the suit, and W is the resultant work. It is generally true that all suits are more mobile at lower pressures. However, because a minimum internal pressure is dictated by life support requirements, the only means of further reducing work is to minimize the change in volume.

All space suit designs try to minimize or eliminate this problem. The most common solution is to form the suit out of multiple layers. The bladder layer is a rubbery, airtight layer much like a balloon. The restraint layer goes outside the bladder, and provides a specific shape for the suit. Since the bladder layer is larger than the restraint layer, the restraint takes all of the stresses caused by the pressure inside the suit. Since the bladder is not under pressure, it will not "pop" like a balloon, even if punctured. The restraint layer is shaped in such a way that bending a joint causes pockets of fabric, called "gores", to open up on the outside of the joint, while folds called "convolutes" fold up on the inside of the joint. The gores make up for the volume lost on the inside of the joint, and keep the suit at a nearly constant volume. However, once the gores are opened all the way, the joint cannot be bent any further without a considerable amount of work.

In some Russian space suits, strips of cloth were wrapped tightly around the cosmonaut's arms and legs outside the space suit to stop the space suit from ballooning when in space.

The outermost layer of a space suit, the Thermal Micrometeoroid Garment, provides thermal insulation, protection from micrometeoroids, and shielding from harmful solar radiation.

There are four main conceptual approaches to suit design:

=== Soft suits ===
Soft suits typically are made mostly of fabrics. All soft suits have some hard parts; some even have hard joint bearings. Intra-vehicular activity and early EVA suits were soft suits.

=== Hard-shell suits ===
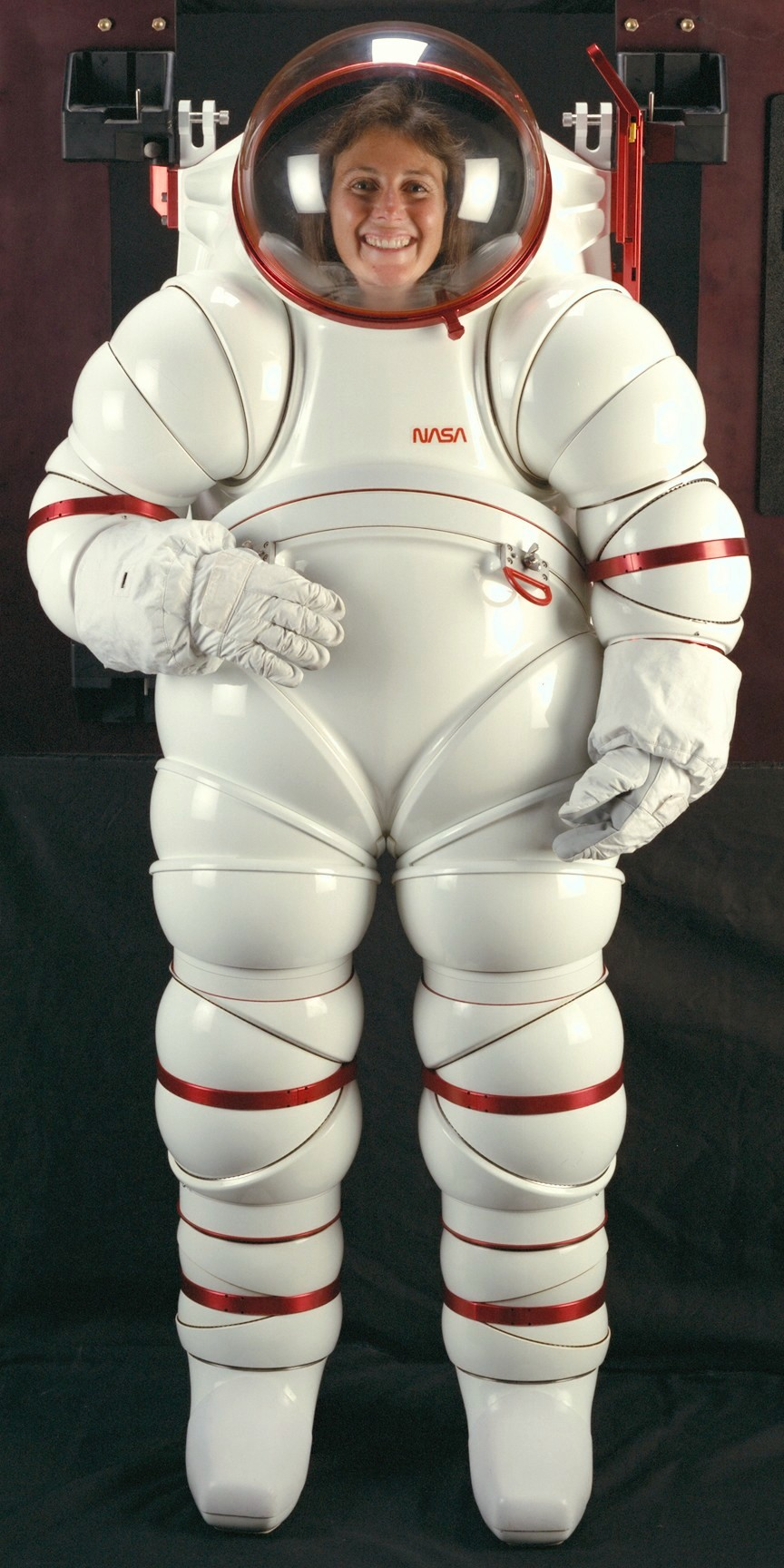
NASA's experimental AX-5 hard-shell space suit (1988)

Hard-shell suits are usually made of metal or composite materials and do not use fabric for joints. Hard suits joints use ball bearings and wedge-ring segments similar to an adjustable elbow of a stove pipe to allow a wide range of movement with the arms and legs. The joints maintain a constant volume of air internally and do not have any counter-force. Therefore, the astronaut does not need to exert to hold the suit in any position. Hard suits can also operate at higher pressures which would eliminate the need for an astronaut to pre-breathe oxygen to use a 34 kPa (4.9 psi) space suit before an EVA from a 101 kPa (14.6 psi) spacecraft cabin. The joints may get into a restricted or locked position requiring the astronaut to manipulate or program the joint. The NASA Ames Research Center experimental AX-5 hard-shell space suit had a flexibility rating of 95%. The wearer could move into 95% of the positions they could without the suit on.

=== Hybrid suits ===
Hybrid suits have hard-shell parts and fabric parts. NASA's Extravehicular Mobility Unit (EMU) uses a fiberglass Hard Upper Torso (HUT) and fabric limbs. ILC Dover's I-Suit replaces the HUT with a fabric soft upper torso to save weight, restricting the use of hard components to the joint bearings, helmet, waist seal, and rear entry hatch. Virtually all workable space suit designs incorporate hard components, particularly at interfaces such as the waist seal, bearings, and in the case of rear-entry suits, the back hatch, where all-soft alternatives are not viable.

=== Skintight suits ===
Skintight suits, also known as mechanical counterpressure suits or space activity suits, are a proposed design which would use a heavy elastic body stocking to compress the body. The head is in a pressurized helmet, but the rest of the body is pressurized only by the elastic effect of the suit. This reduces the possibility of a space suit depressurization and gives a very lightweight suit. When not worn, the elastic garments may appear to be that of clothing for a small child. These suits may be very difficult to put on and face problems with providing a uniform pressure. Most proposals use the body's natural perspiration to keep cool. Sweat evaporates readily in vacuum and may desublime or deposit on objects nearby: optics, sensors, the astronaut's visor, and other surfaces. The icy film and sweat residue may contaminate sensitive surfaces and affect optical performance.

== Contributing technologies ==
Related preceding technologies include the stratonautical space suit, the gas mask used in World War II, the oxygen mask used by pilots of high-flying bombers in World War II, the high-altitude or vacuum suit required by pilots of the Lockheed U-2 and SR-71 Blackbird, the diving suit, rebreather, scuba diving gear, and many others.

Many space suit designs are taken from the U.S. Air Force suits, which are designed to work in "high-altitude aircraft pressure[s]", such as the Mercury IVA suit or the Gemini G4C, or the Advanced Crew Escape Suits.

=== Glove technology ===
The Mercury IVA, the first U.S. space suit design, included lights at the tips of the gloves in order to provide visual aid. As the need for extravehicular activity grew, suits such as the Apollo A7L included gloves made of a metal fabric called Chromel-r in order to prevent punctures. In order to retain a better sense of touch for the astronauts, the fingertips of the gloves were made of silicone. With the shuttle program, it became necessary to be able to operate spacecraft modules, so the ACES suits featured gripping on the gloves. EMU gloves, which are used for spacewalks, are heated to keep the astronaut's hands warm. The Phase VI gloves, meant for use with the Mark III suit, are the first gloves to be designed with "laser scanning technology, 3D computer modeling, stereo lithography, laser cutting technology and CNC machining". This allows for cheaper, more accurate production, as well as increased detail in joint mobility and flexibility.

=== Life support technology ===
Prior to the Apollo missions, life support in space suits was connected to the space capsule via an umbilical cable. However, with the Apollo missions, life support was configured into a removable capsule called the Portable Life Support System that allowed the astronaut to explore the Moon without having to be attached to the space craft. The EMU space suit, used for spacewalks, allows the astronaut to manually control the internal environment of the suit. The Mark III suit has a backpack containing about 12 pounds of liquid air for breathing, pressurization, and heat exchange.

=== Helmet technology ===
The development of the spheroidal dome helmet was key in balancing the need for field of view, pressure compensation, and low weight. One inconvenience with some space suits is the head being fixed facing forwards and being unable to turn to look sideways. Astronauts call this effect "alligator head".

=== High-altitude suits ===
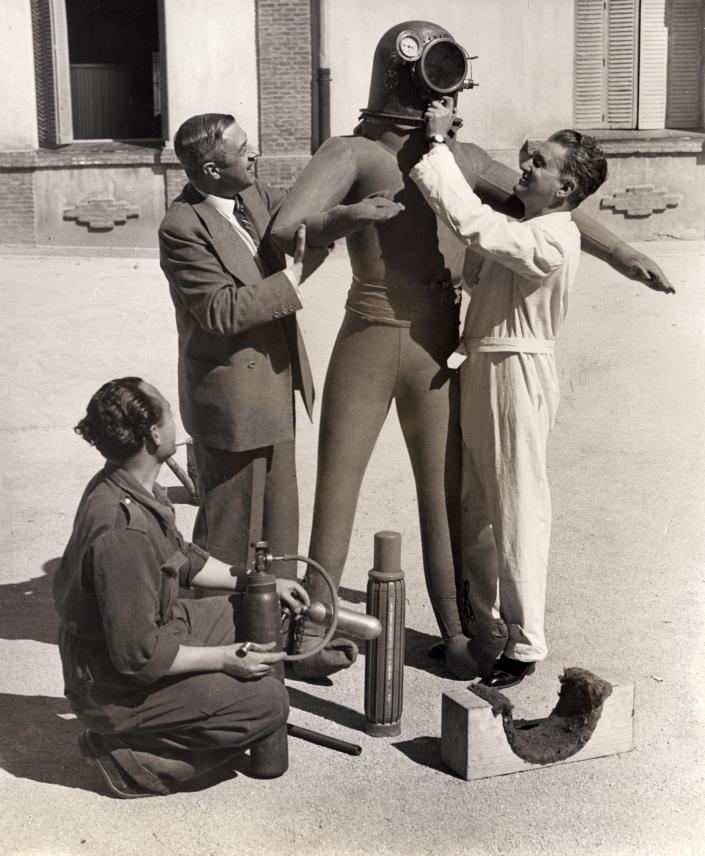
Pressurised suit prototype designed by military engineer Emilio Herrera for a stratospheric balloon flight. c. 1935

- Evgeniy Chertovsky created his full-pressure suit or high-altitude "skafandr" (скафандр) in 1931. (скафандр also means "diving suit").
- Emilio Herrera designed and built a full-pressure "stratonautical space suit" in 1935, which was to have been used during an open-basket balloon stratospheric flight scheduled for early 1936.
- In 1938 the Italian Air Force developed a high-altitude, semi-rigid pressurized suit, the first to be successfully used in operational conditions on October 22, 1938, by Lt.Col. Mario Pezzi during his first high-altitude record flight.
- Wiley Post experimented with a number of pressure suits for record-breaking flights.
- Russell Colley created the space suits worn by the Project Mercury astronauts, including fitting Alan Shepard for his ride as America's first man in space on May 5, 1961.

== List of space suit models ==
=== Soviet and Russian suit models ===
- SK series (CK) – the spacesuit used for the Vostok program (1961–1963). Worn by Yuri Gagarin on the first crewed space flight.
- No pressure suits were worn aboard Voskhod 1.
- Berkut (Беркут meaning "golden eagle") – the spacesuit was a modified SK-1 used by the crew of Voskhod 2 which included Alexei Leonov on the first spacewalk during (1965).
- From Soyuz 1 to Soyuz 11 (1967–1971) no pressure suits were worn during launch and reentry.
- Yastreb (Ястреб meaning "hawk") – extravehicular activity spacesuit used during a crew exchange between Soyuz 4 and Soyuz 5 (1969).
- Krechet-94 (Кречет meaning "gyrfalcon") – designed for the canceled Soviet crewed Moon landing.
- Strizh (Стриж meaning "swift (bird)") – developed for pilots of Buran-class orbiters.
- Sokol (Сокол meaning "falcon") – suits worn by Soyuz crew members during launch and reentry. They were first worn on Soyuz 12. They have been used from 1973 to present.
- Orlan (Орлан meaning "sea-eagle" or "bald eagle") – suits for extravehicular activity, originally developed for the Soviet lunar program as a lunar orbit EVA suit. It is Russia's EVA suit since 1977.
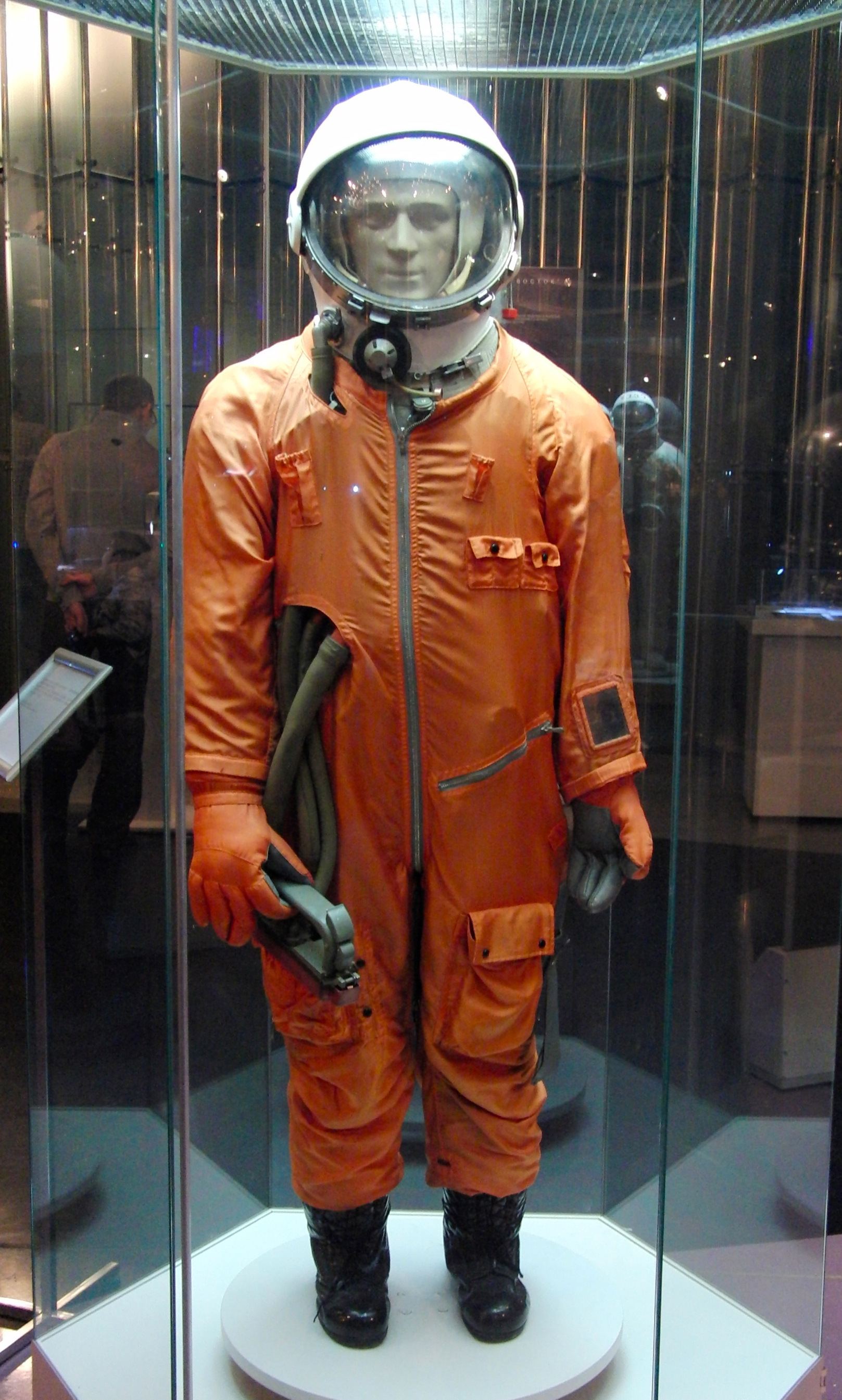
SK-1 space suit

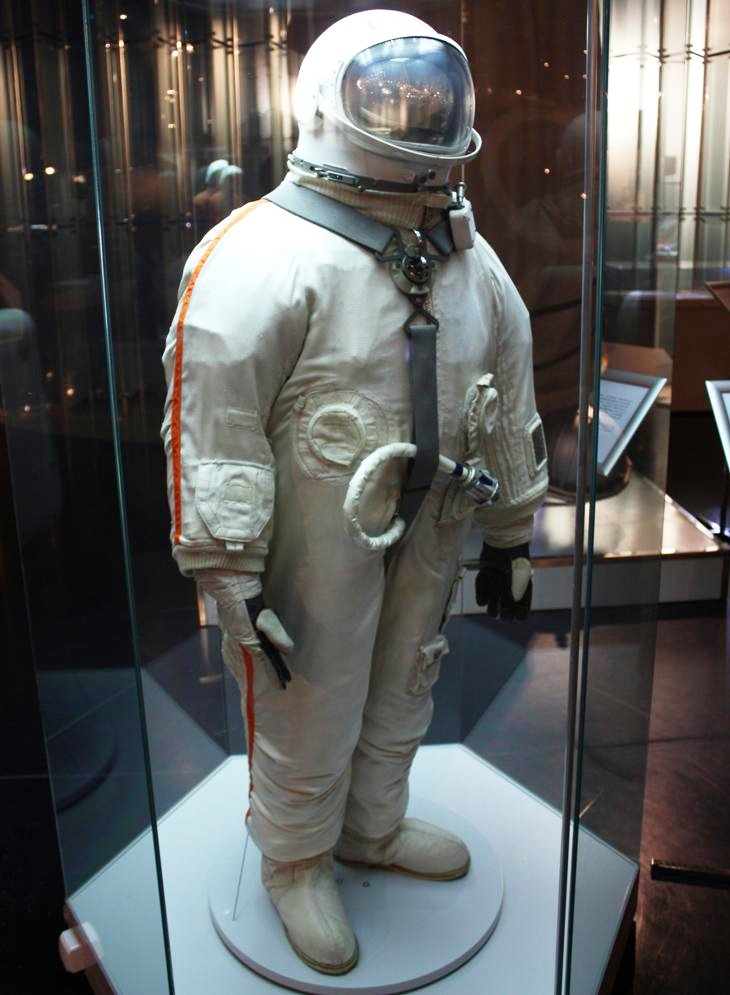
Berkut space suit

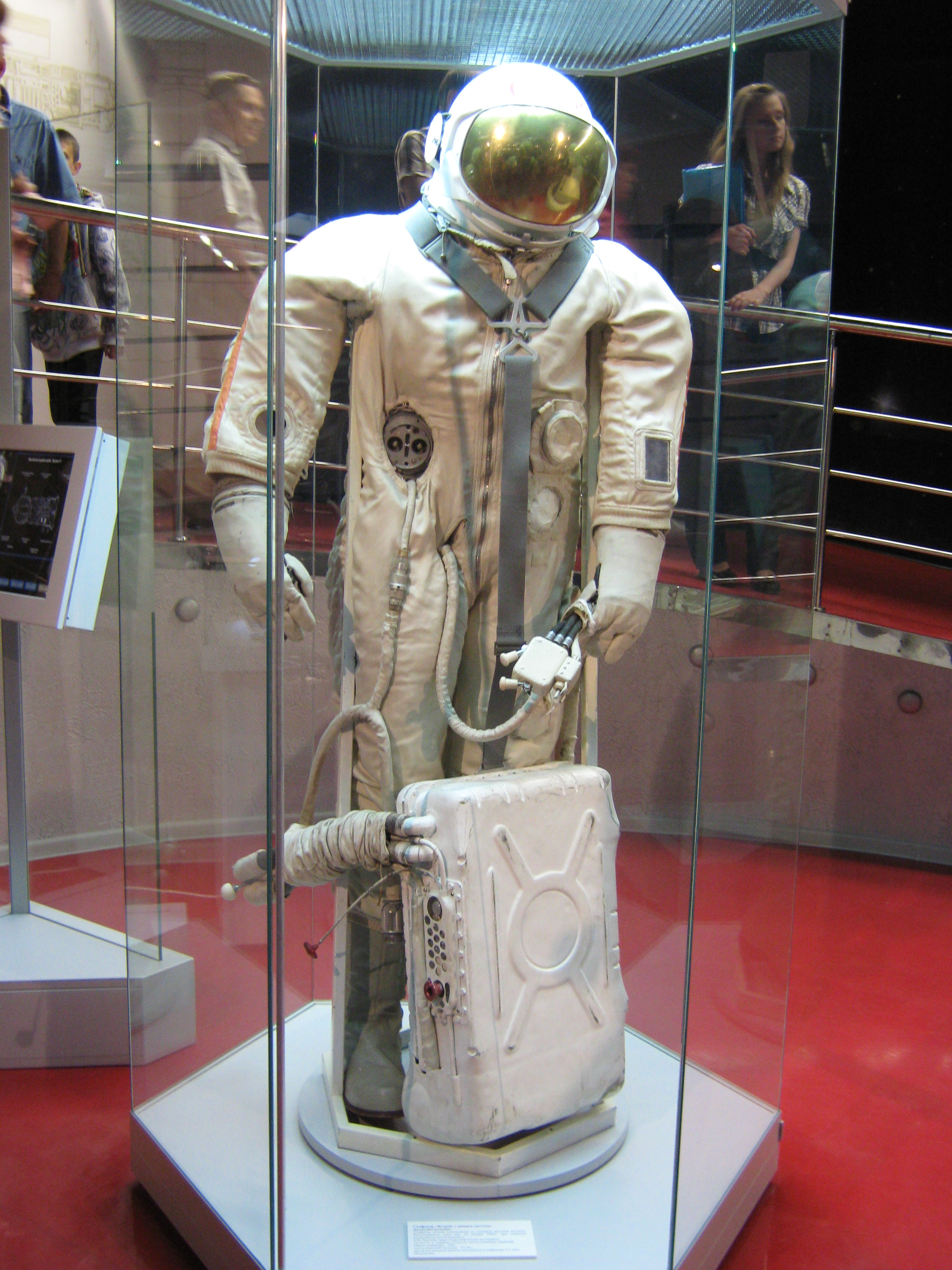
Yastreb space suit

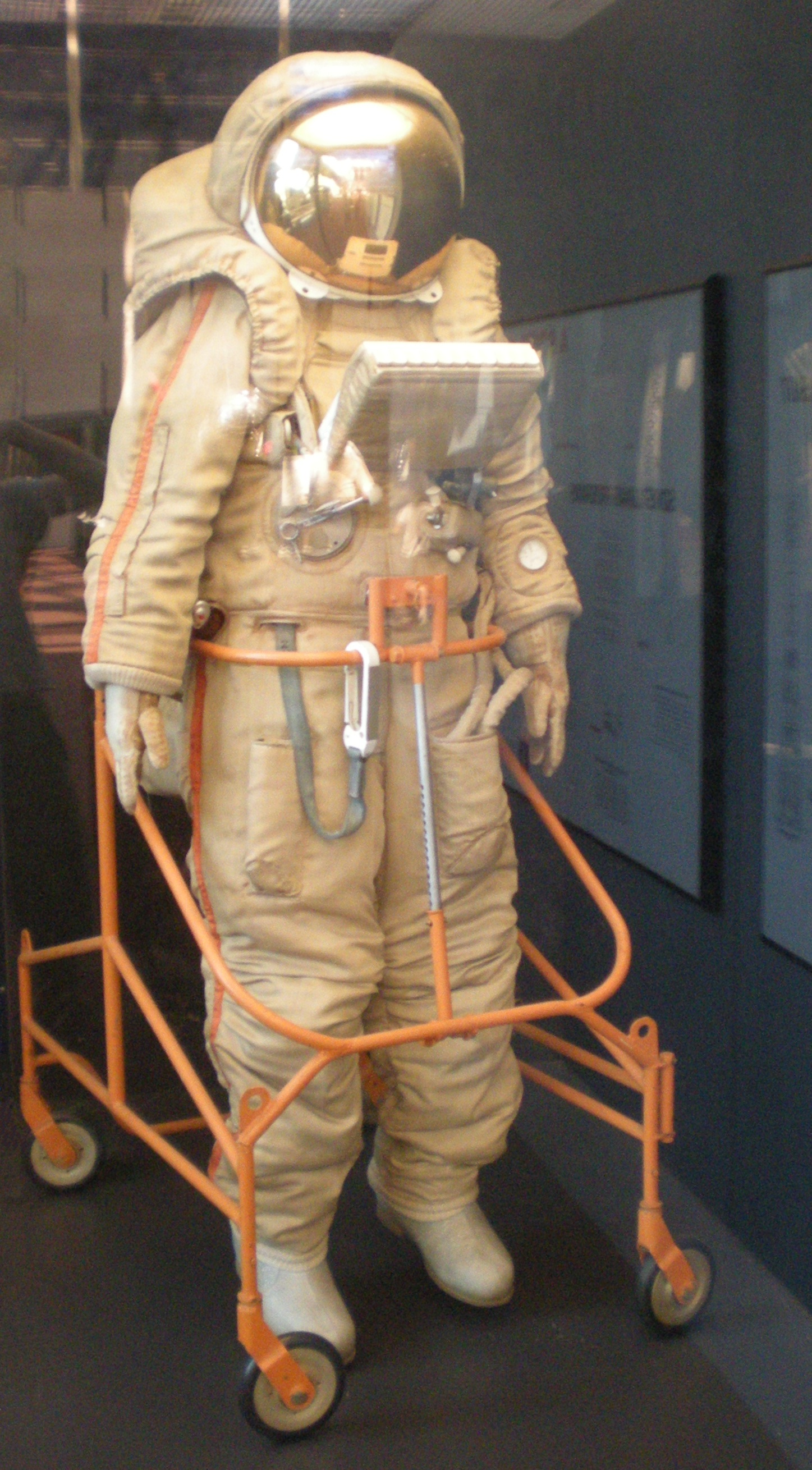
Krechet space suit

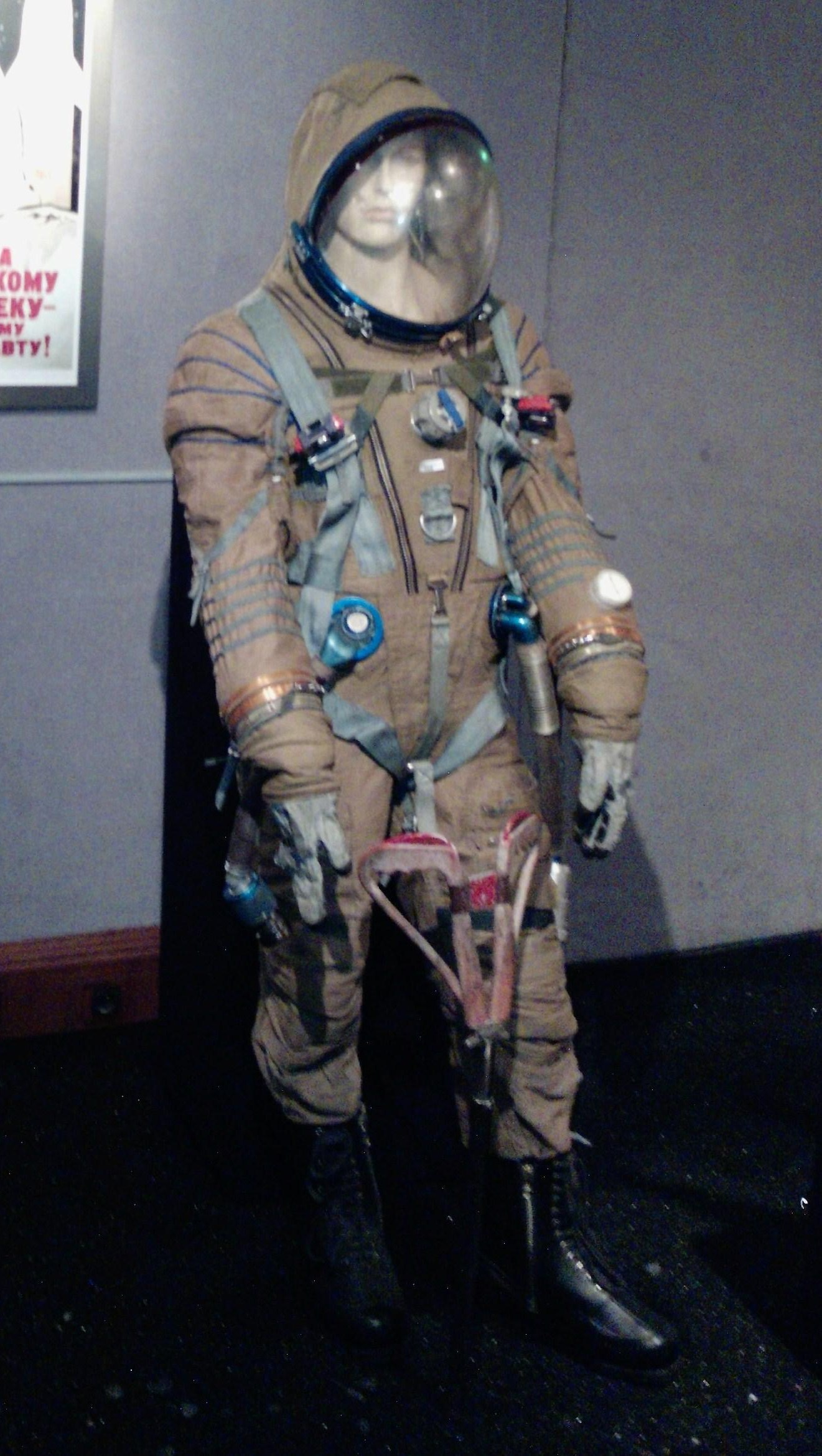
Strizh space suit

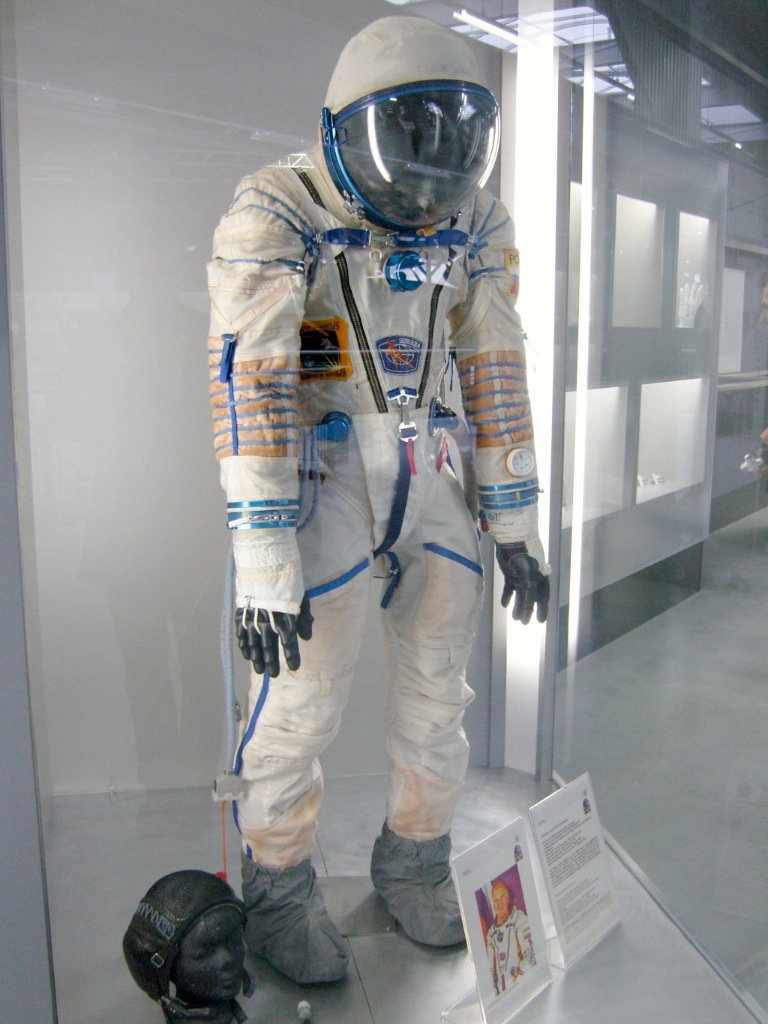
Sokol-KV2 space suit

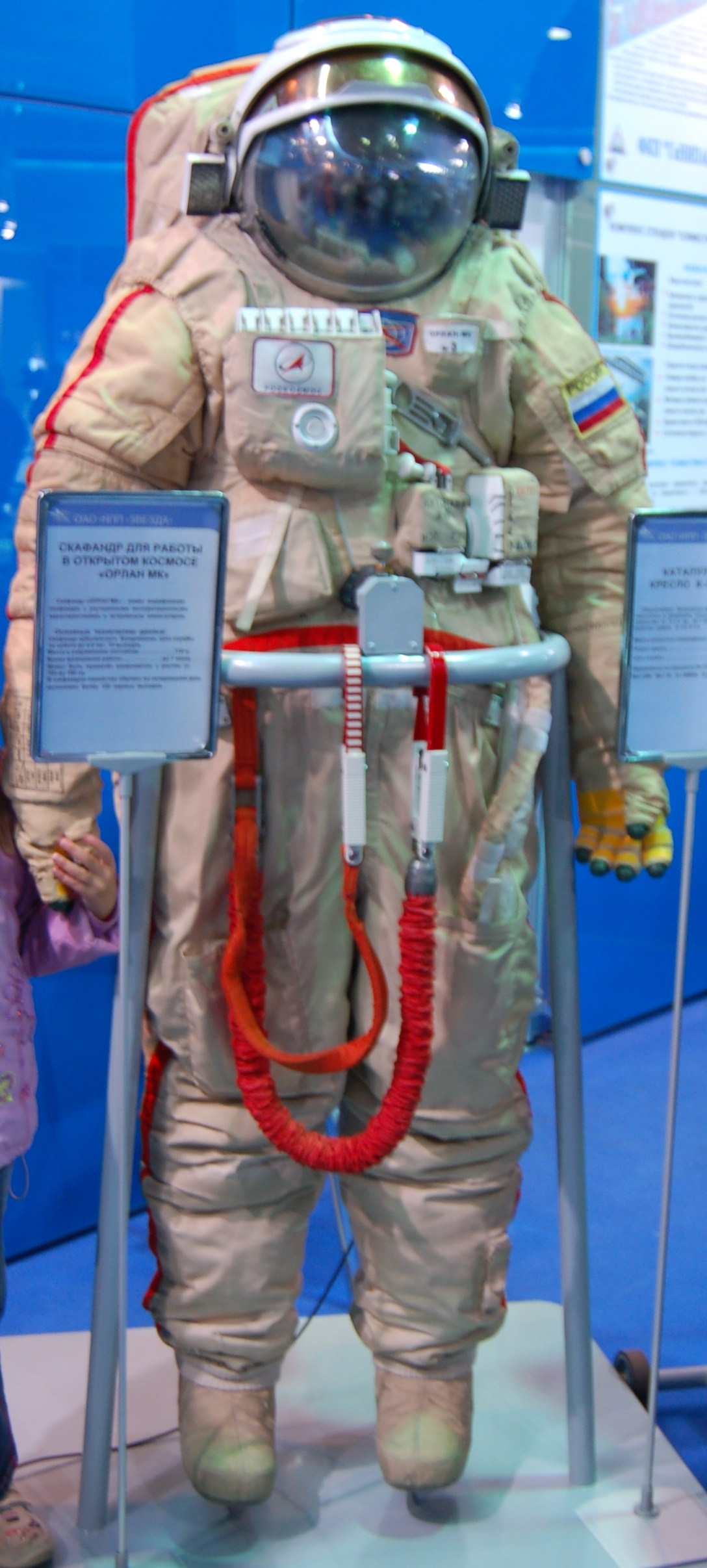
Orlan-MK space suit

=== United States suit models ===
- In the early 1950s, Siegfried Hansen and colleagues at Litton Industries designed and built a working hard-shell suit, which was used inside vacuum chambers and was the predecessor of space suits used in NASA missions.
- Navy Mark IV high-altitude/vacuum suit – used for Project Mercury (1961–1963).
- Gemini space suits (1965–1966) – there were three main variants developed: G3C designed for intra-vehicle use; G4C specially designed for EVA and intra-vehicle use; and a special G5C spacesuit worn by the Gemini 7 crew for 14 days inside the spacecraft.
- Manned Orbiting Laboratory MH-7 space suits for the canceled MOL program.
- Apollo Block I A1C suit (1966–1967) – a derivative of the Gemini suit, worn by primary and backup crews in training for two early Apollo missions. The nylon pressure garment melted and burned through in the Apollo 1 cabin fire. This suit became obsolete when crewed Block I Apollo flights were discontinued after the fire.
- Apollo/Skylab A7L EVA and Moon suits – The Block II Apollo suit was the primary pressure suit worn for eleven Apollo flights, three Skylab flights, and the US astronauts on the Apollo–Soyuz Test Project between 1968 and 1975. The pressure garment's nylon outer layer was replaced with fireproof Beta cloth after the Apollo 1 fire. This suit was the first to employ a liquid-cooled inner garment and outer micrometeoroid garment. Beginning with the Apollo 13 mission, it also introduced "commander's stripes" so that a pair of space walkers will not appear identical on camera.
- Shuttle Ejection Escape Suit – used from STS-1 (1981) to STS-4 (1982) by a two-man crew used in conjunction with the then-installed ejection seats. Derived from a USAF model. These were removed once the Shuttle became certified.
- From STS-5 (1982) to STS-51-L (1986) no pressure suits were worn during launch and reentry. The crew would wear only a blue-flight suit with an oxygen helmet.
- Launch Entry Suit first used on STS-26 (1988), the first flight after the Challenger disaster. It was a partial pressure suit derived from a USAF model. It was used from 1988 to 1998.
- Advanced Crew Escape Suit used on the Space Shuttle starting in 1994. The Advanced Crew Escape Suit or ACES suit, is a full-pressure suit worn by all Space Shuttle crews for the ascent and entry portions of flight. The suit is a direct descendant of the United States Air Force high-altitude pressure suits worn by SR-71 Blackbird and U-2 spy plane pilots, North American X-15 and Gemini pilot-astronauts, and the Launch Entry Suits worn by NASA astronauts starting on the STS-26 flight. It is derived from a USAF model.
- Extravehicular Mobility Unit (EMU) – used on both the Space Shuttle and International Space Station (ISS). The EMU is an independent anthropomorphic system that provides environmental protection, mobility, life support, and communications for a Space Shuttle or ISS crew member to perform an EVA in Earth orbit. Used from 1982 to present, but only available in limited sizing as of 2019.
- Aerospace company SpaceX developed an IVA suit which is worn by astronauts involved in Commercial Crew Program missions operated by SpaceX since the Demo-2 mission. As a continuation of this suit design, SpaceX developed an EVA suit in 2024. The EVA version of the suit was used during the Polaris Dawn private space mission for the first ever commercial spacewalk.
- Orion Crew Survival System (OCSS) – is being used during launch and re-entry on the Orion MPCV. It is derived from the Advanced Crew Escape Suit but is able to operate at a higher pressure and has improved mobility in the shoulders.
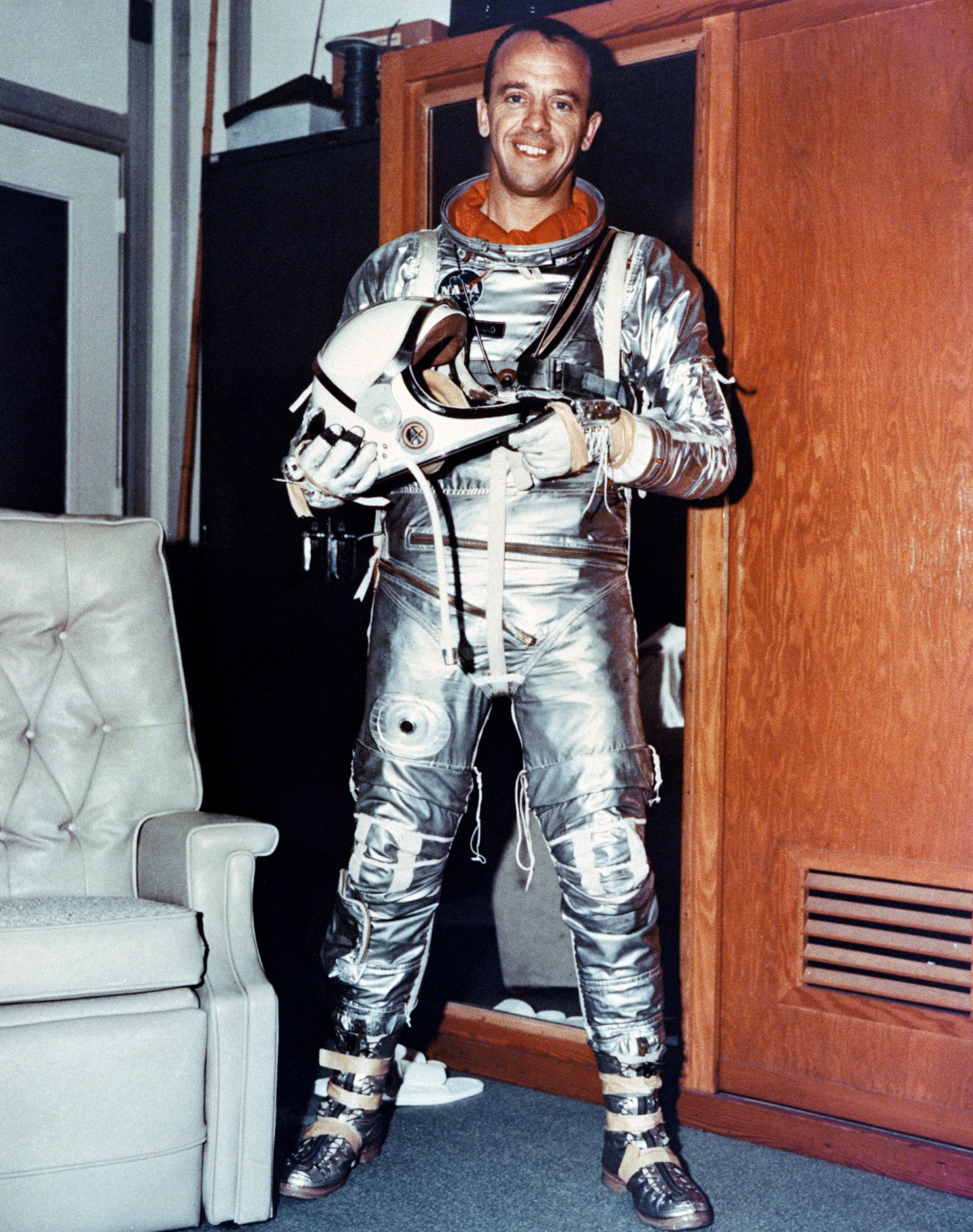
Mercury suit

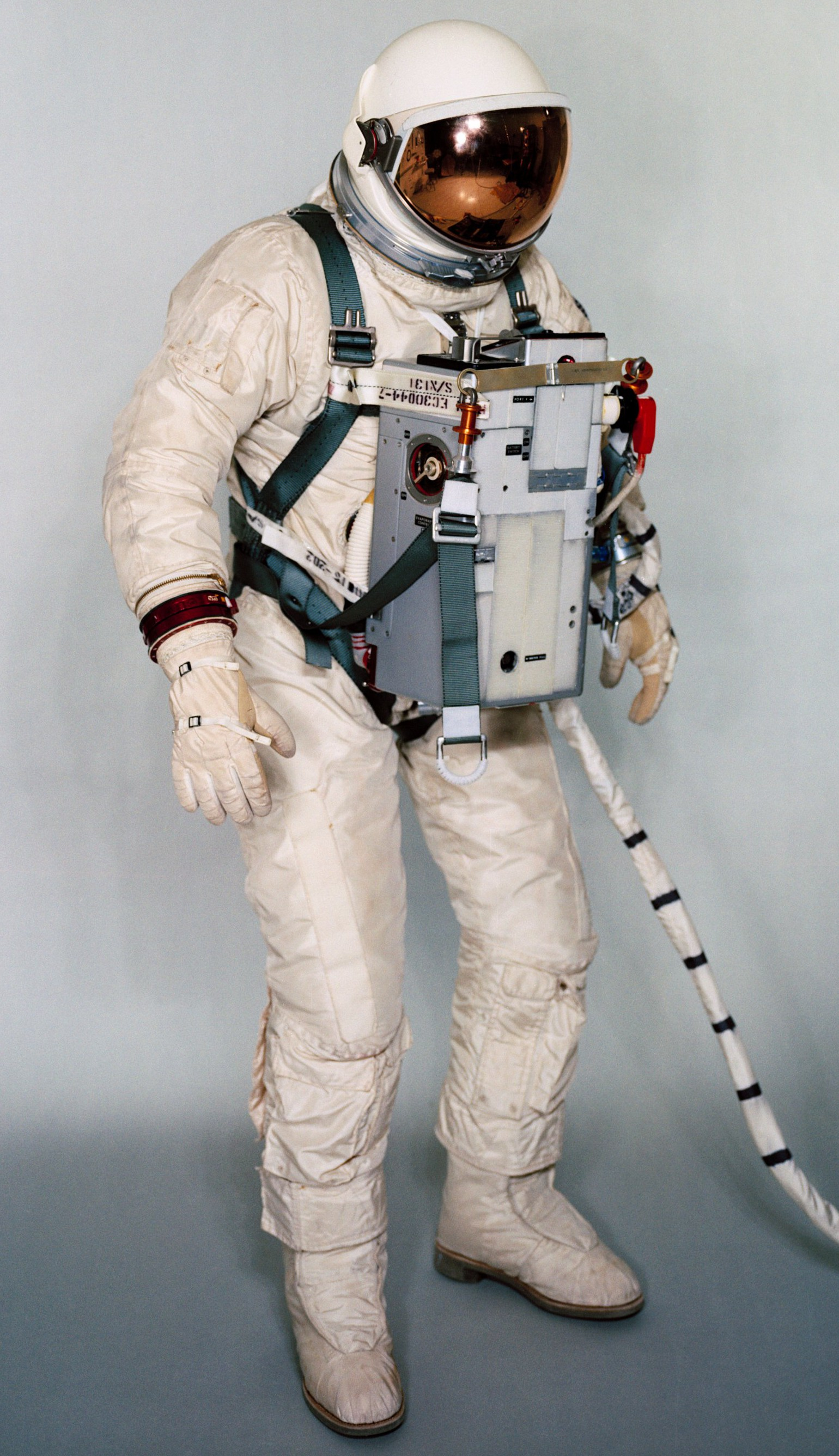
Gemini G4C suit

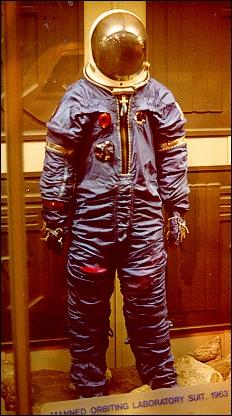
Manned Orbital Laboratory MH-7 space suit

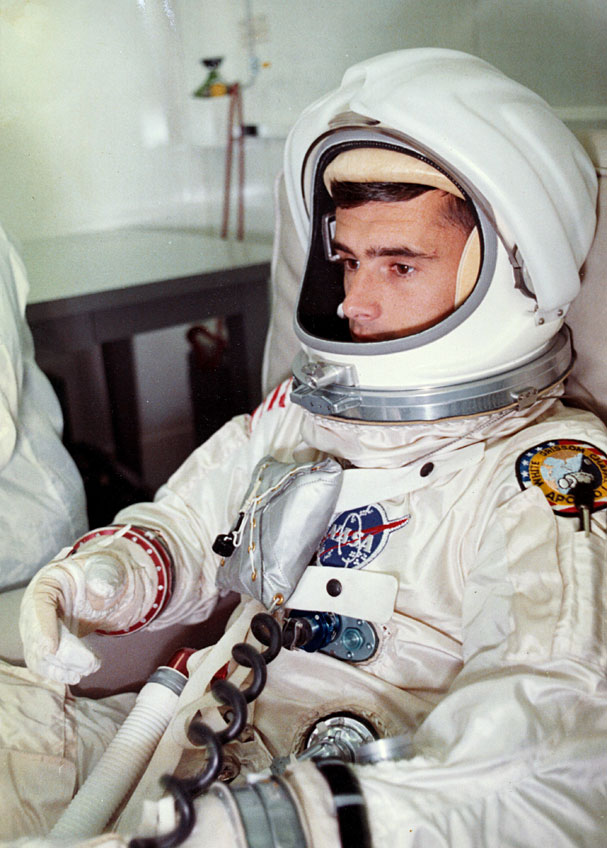
Apollo Block I A1C suit

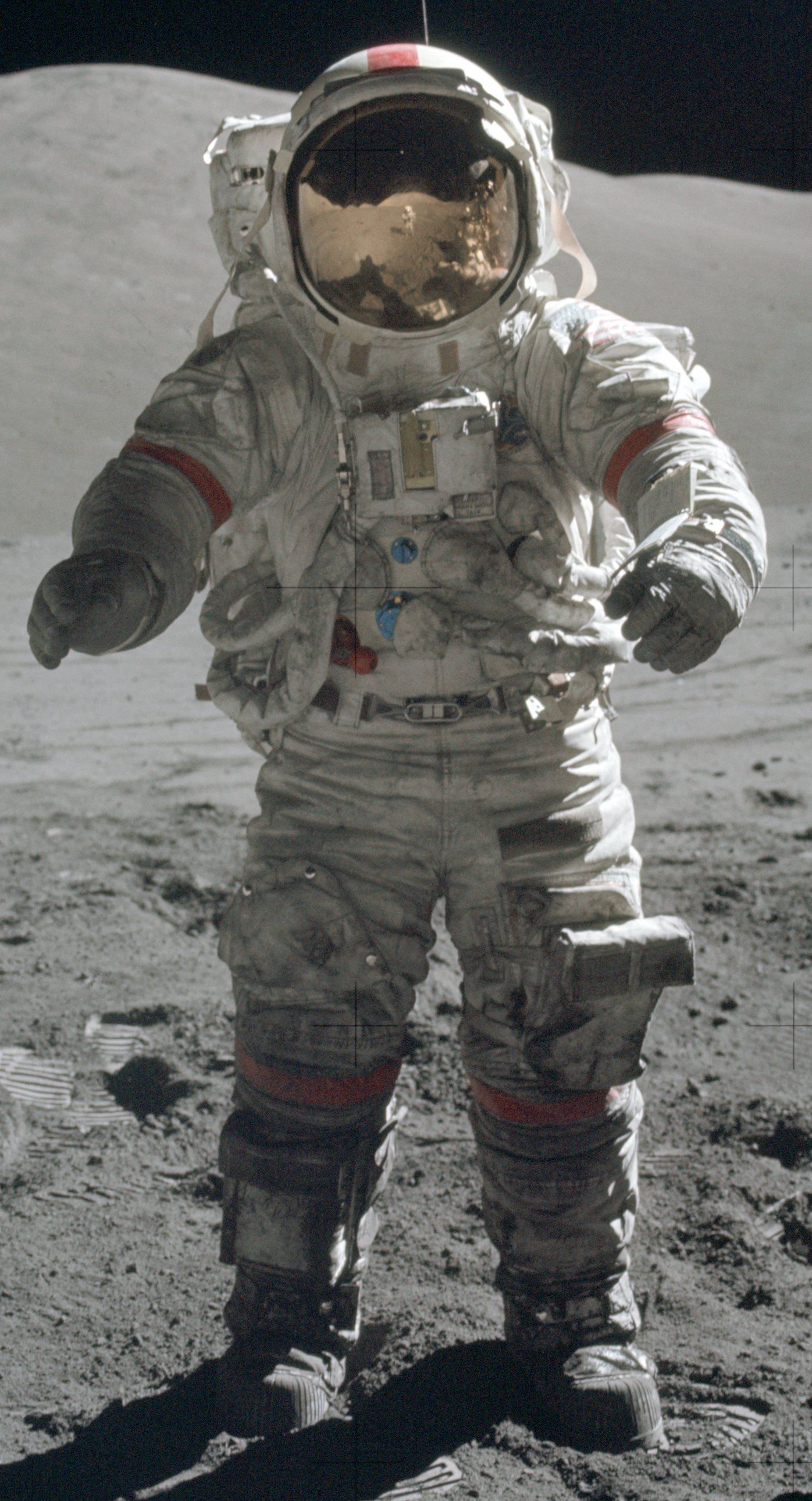
Apollo/Skylab space suit

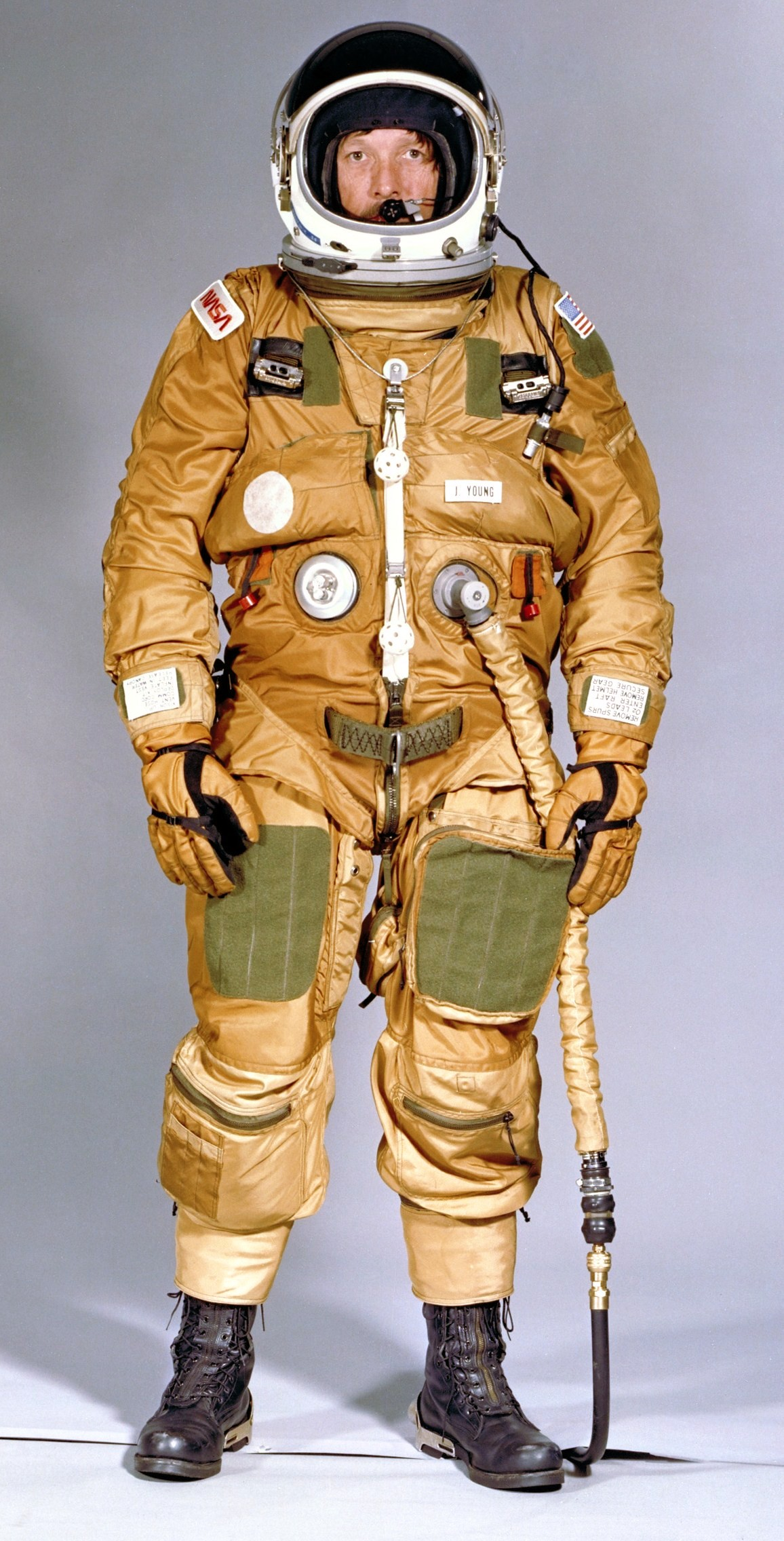
Shuttle Ejection Escape Suit

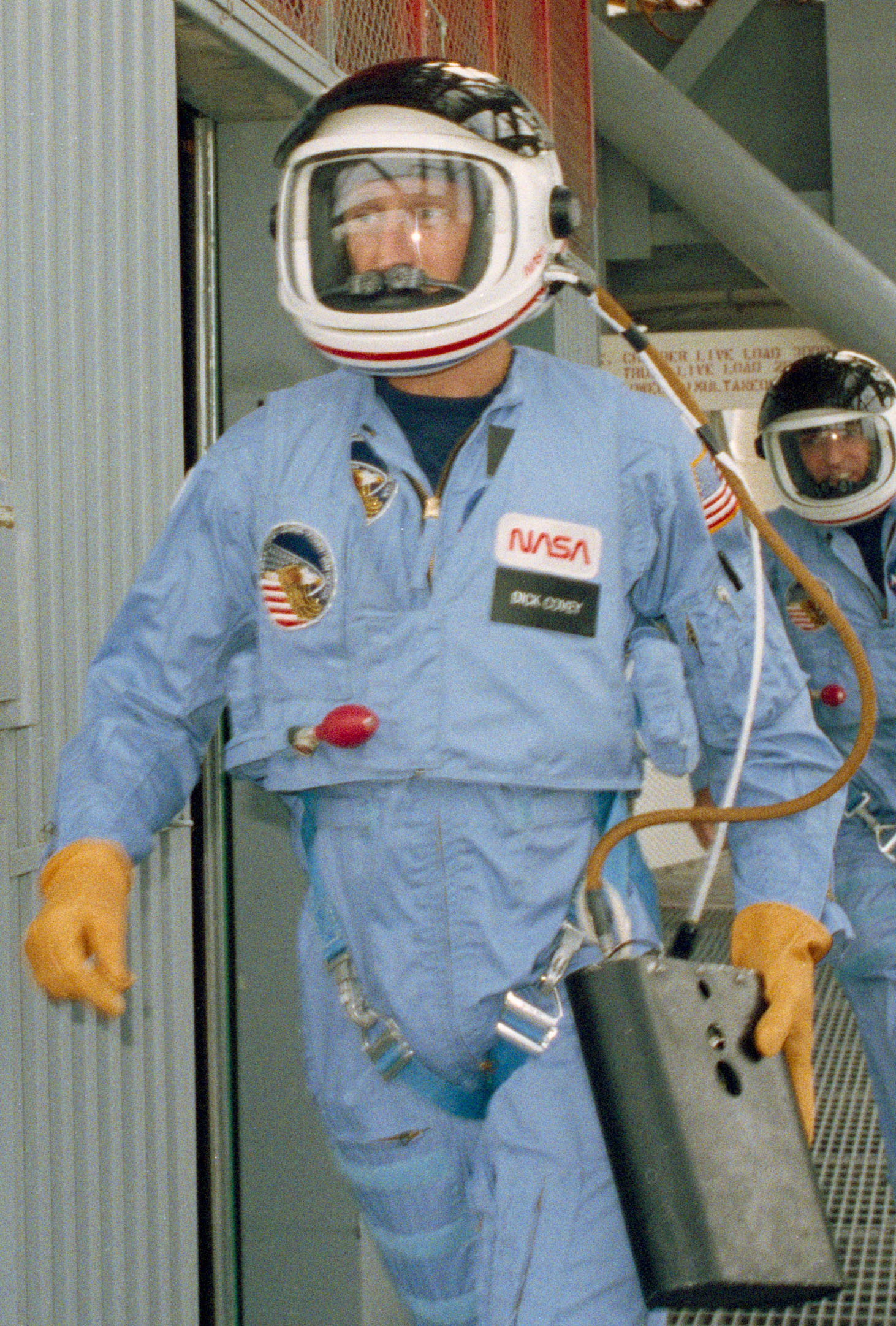
Shuttle Flight Suit

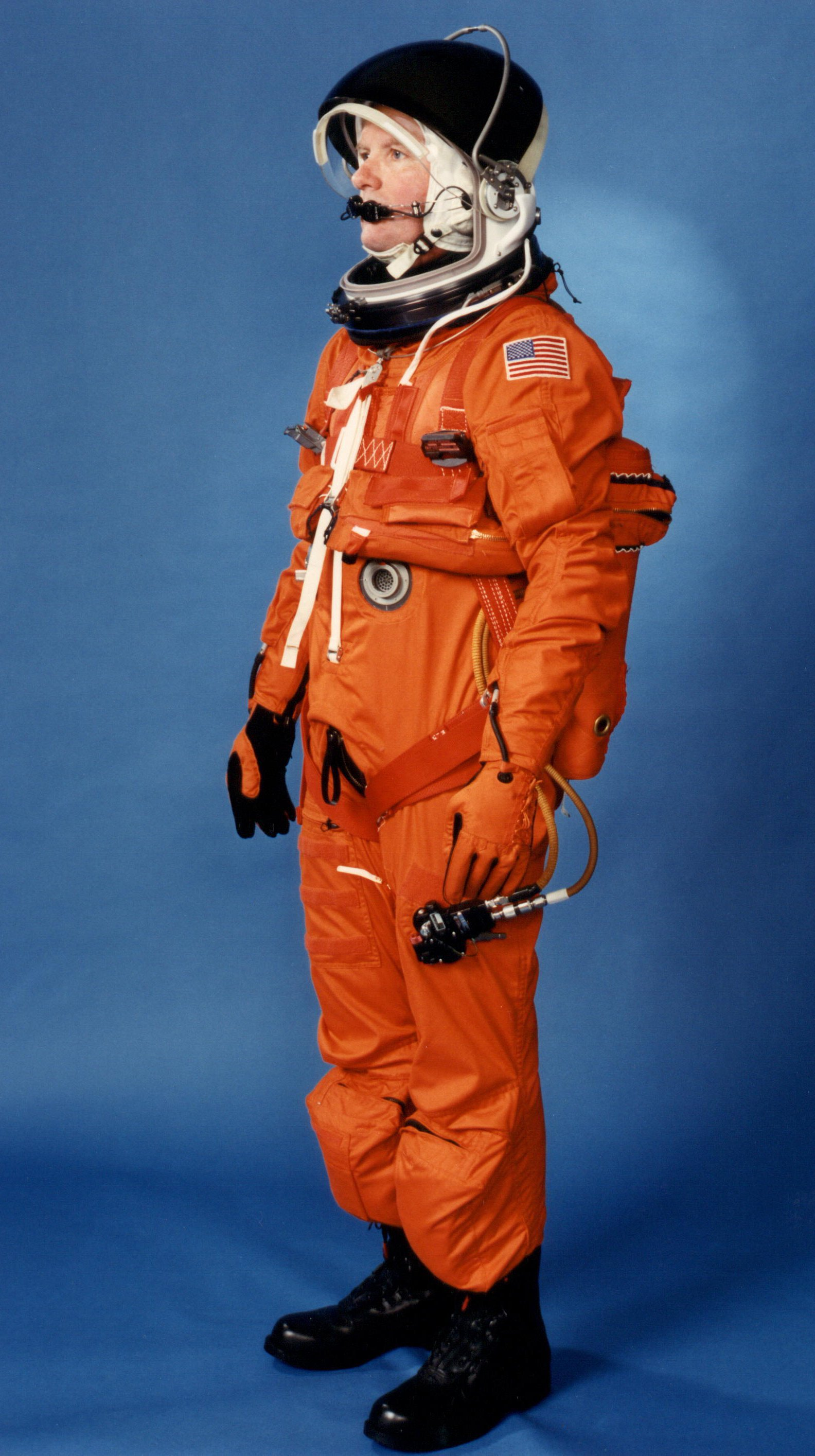
Launch Entry Suit

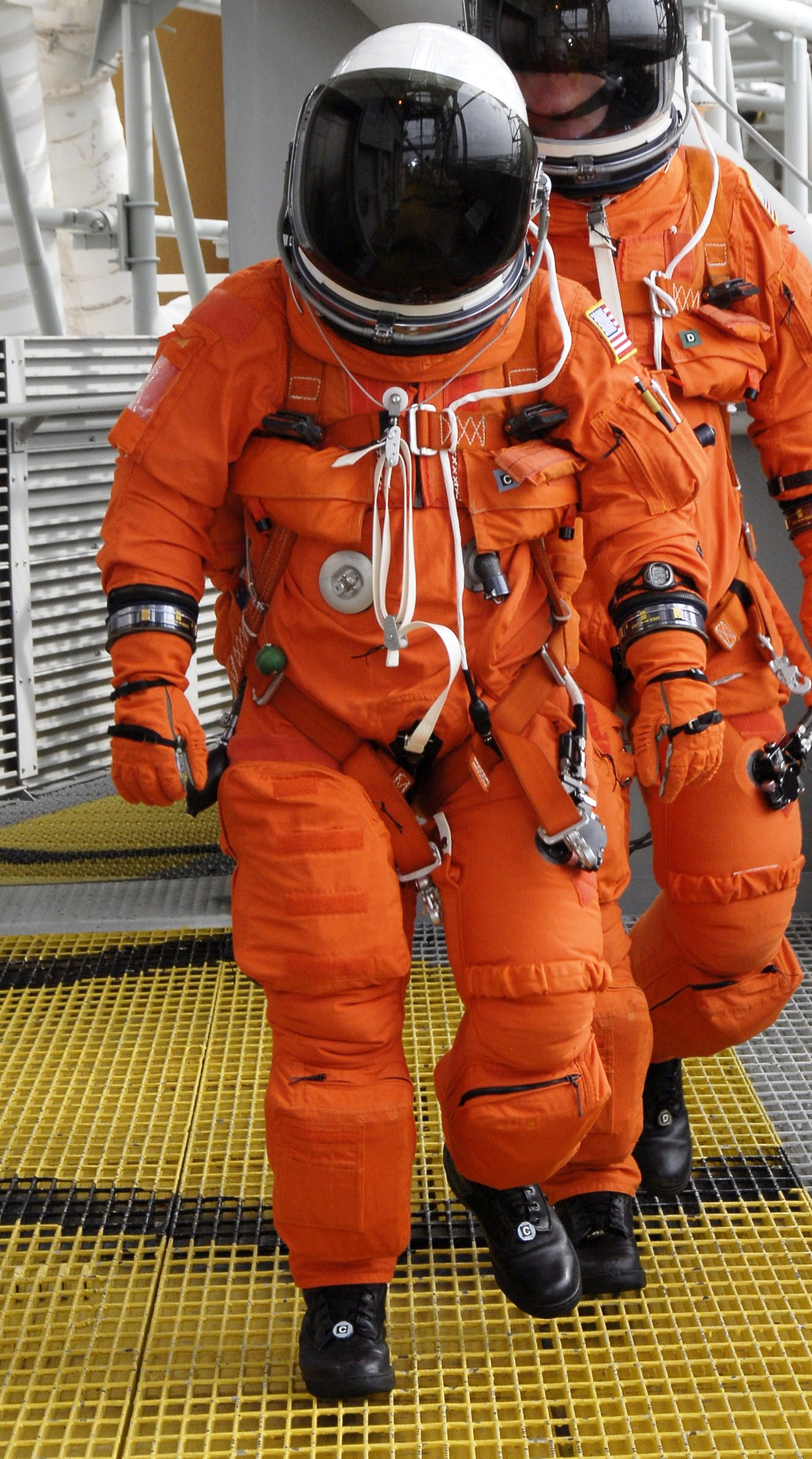
Advance Crew Escape Suit

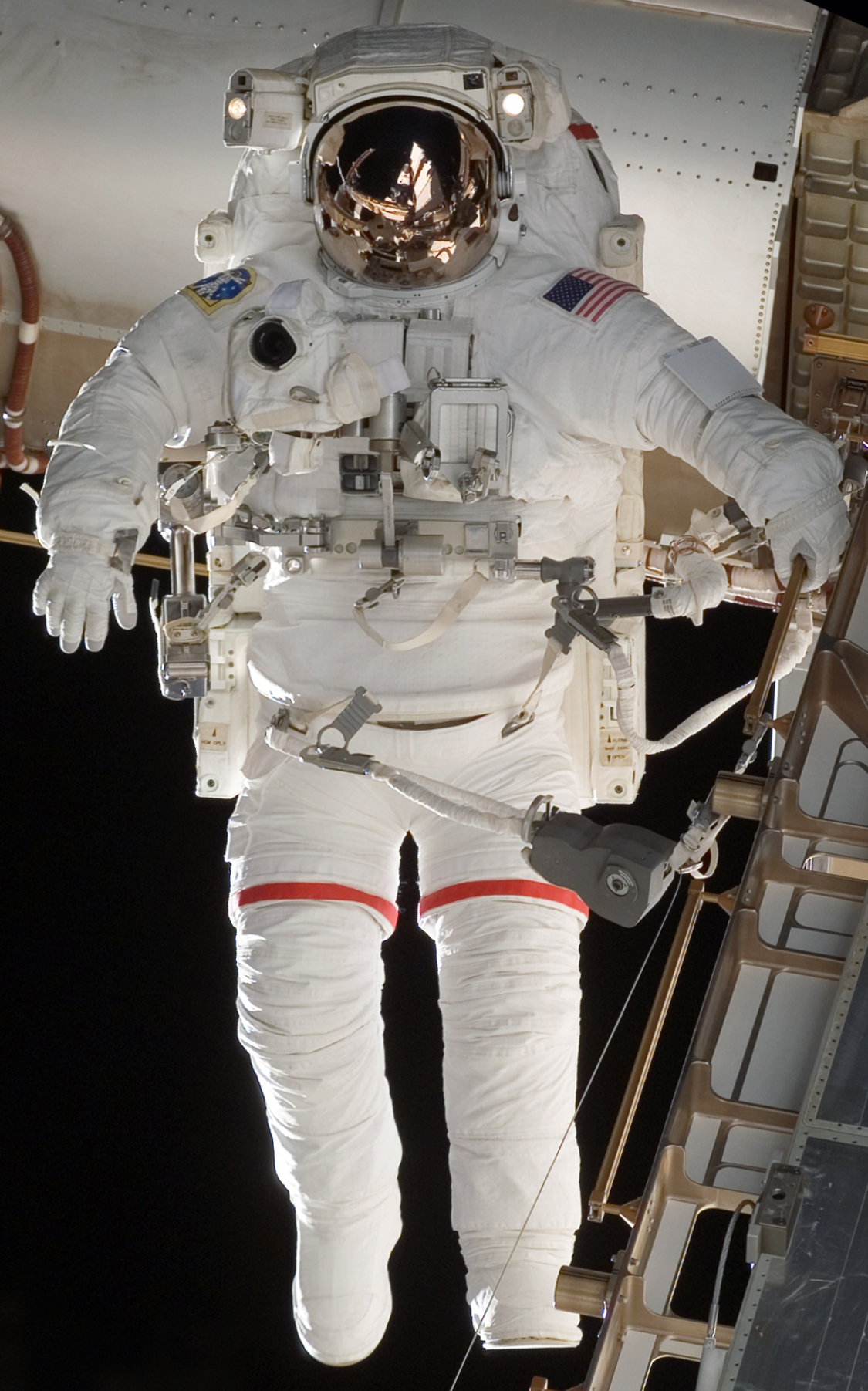
Extravehicular Mobility Unit

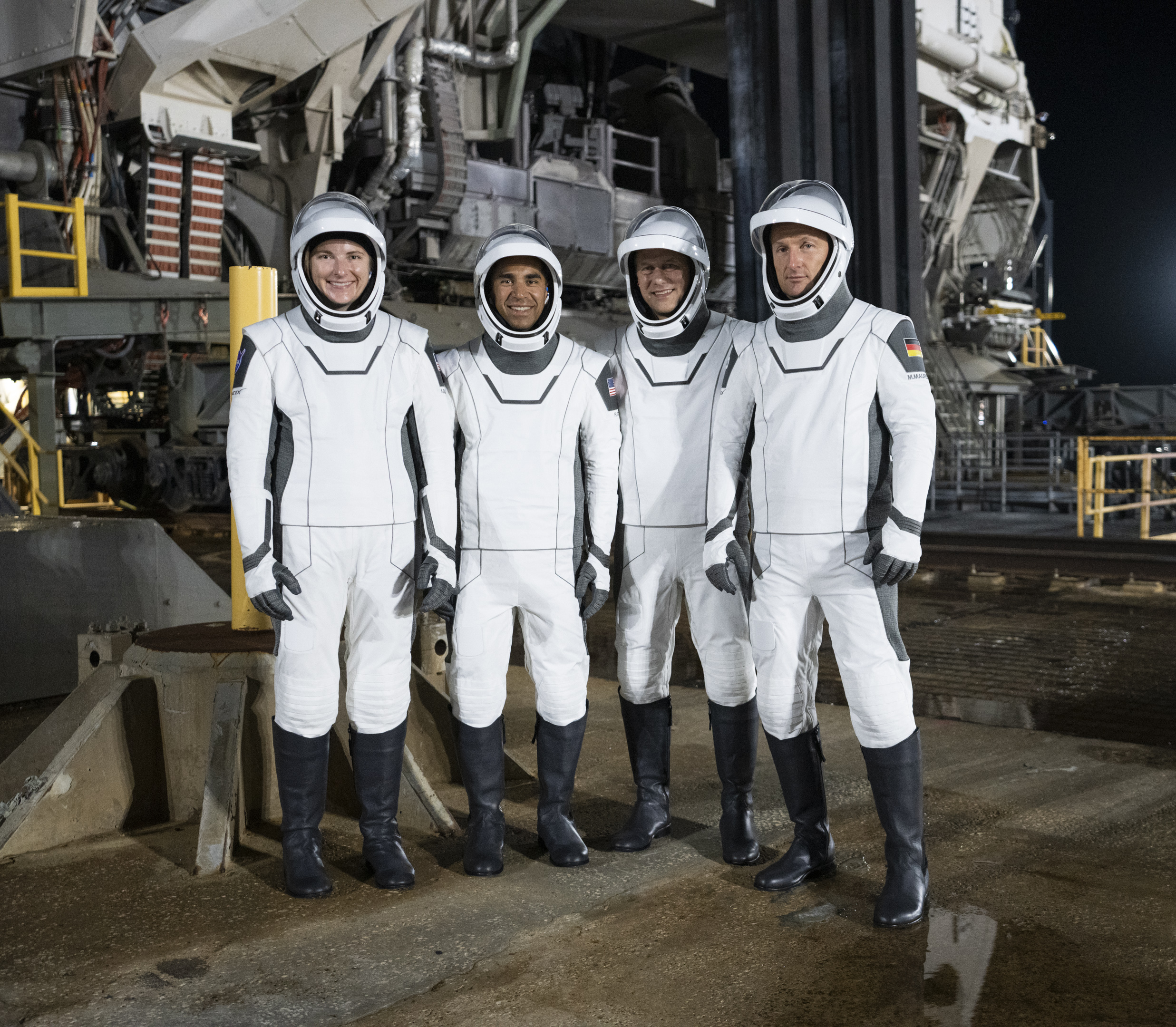
SpaceX IVA suit

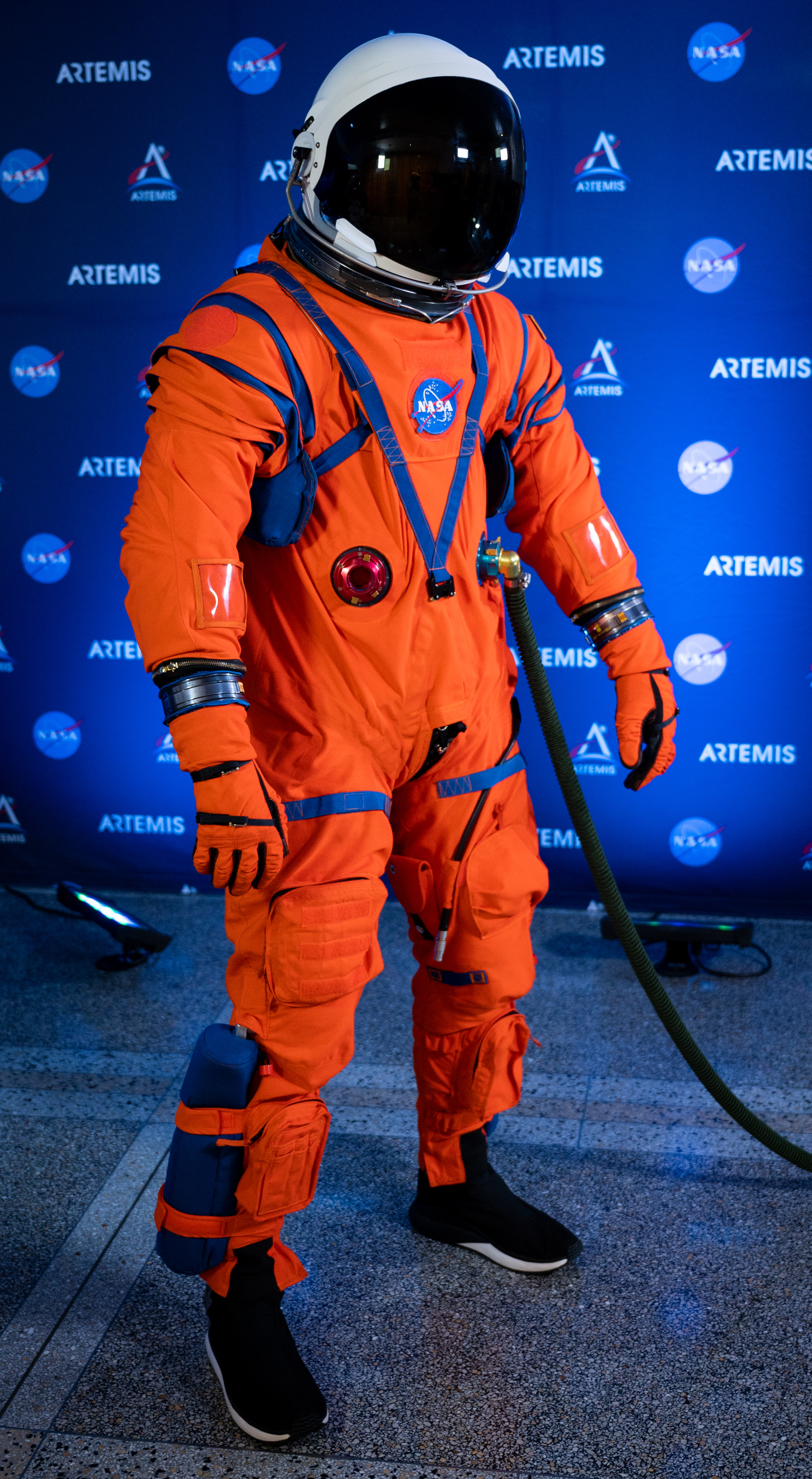
Orion Crew Survival Suit

==== SpaceX suit ("Starman suit") ====
In February 2015, SpaceX began developing a space suit for astronauts to wear within the Dragon 2 space capsule. Its appearance was jointly designed by Jose Fernandez—a Hollywood costume designer known for his works for superhero and science fiction films—and SpaceX founder and CEO Elon Musk. The first images of the suit were revealed in September 2017. A mannequin, called "Starman" (after David Bowie's song of the same name), wore the SpaceX space suit during the maiden launch of the Falcon Heavy in February 2018. For this exhibition launch, the suit was not pressurized and carried no sensors.

The suit, which is suitable for vacuum, offers protection against cabin depressurization through a single tether at the astronaut's thigh that feeds air and electronic connections. The helmets, which are 3D-printed, contain microphones and speakers. As the suits need the tether connection and do not offer protection against radiation, they are not used for extra-vehicular activities. The suits are custom-made for each astronaut.

In 2018, NASA commercial crew astronauts Bob Behnken, and Doug Hurley tested the spacesuit inside the Dragon 2 spacecraft in order to familiarize themselves with the suit. They wore it in the Crew Dragon Demo-2 flight launched on 30 May 2020. The suit is worn by astronauts involved in Commercial Crew Program missions involving SpaceX.

On 4 May 2024, SpaceX unveiled a spacesuit designed for extravehicular activity based on the IVA suit for Polaris Dawn mission in Polaris program. As with the IVA suit, the helmets are 3D-printed, though the EVA helmet incorporates a heads-up display providing information and a camera on suit metrics during operation. It is more mobile, includes new thermal insulation fabrics, and materials used Falcon's interstage and Crew Dragon's external unpressurized trunk.

==== Future NASA contracted suits ====
On 1 June 2022, NASA announced it had selected competing Axiom Space and Collins Aerospace to develop and provide astronauts with next generation spacesuit and spacewalk systems to first test and later use outside the International Space Station, as well as on the lunar surface for the crewed Artemis missions, and prepare for human missions to Mars.

The first in space test flight of AxEMU suit is scheduled for 2027 in ISS. It will be later used in Artemis program.

=== Chinese suit models ===
- Shuguang (曙光, meaning "Dawn") space suit : First generation EVA space suit developed by China for the 1967 canceled Project 714 crewed space program. It has a mass of about 10 kilograms (20 lb), has an orange colour, and is made of high-resistance multi-layer polyester fabric. The astronaut could use it inside the cabin and conduct an EVA as well.
- 'Project 863 space suit: Cancelled project of second generation Chinese EVA space suit.
- Shenzhou IVA (神舟, meaning "Divine Vessel") space suit: The suit was first worn by Yang Liwei on Shenzhou 5, the first crewed Chinese space flight, it closely resembles a Sokol-KV2 suit, but it is believed to be a Chinese-made version rather than an actual Russian suit. Pictures show that the suits on Shenzhou 6 differ in detail from the earlier suit; they are also reported to be lighter.
- Haiying (海鹰, meaning "Sea Hawk") EVA space suit: The imported Russian Orlan-M EVA suit is called Haiying. Used on Shenzhou 7.
- Feitian (飞天, meaning "Sky Flyer") EVA space suit: Indigenously developed Chinese-made EVA space suit also used for the Shenzhou 7 mission. The suit was designed for a spacewalk mission of up to seven hours. Chinese astronauts have been training in the out-of-capsule space suits since July 2007, and movements are seriously restricted in the suits, with a mass of more than 110 kilograms (240 lb) each. A new generation of Feitian space suit has been used since 2021 as the construction of Tiangong Space Station began.
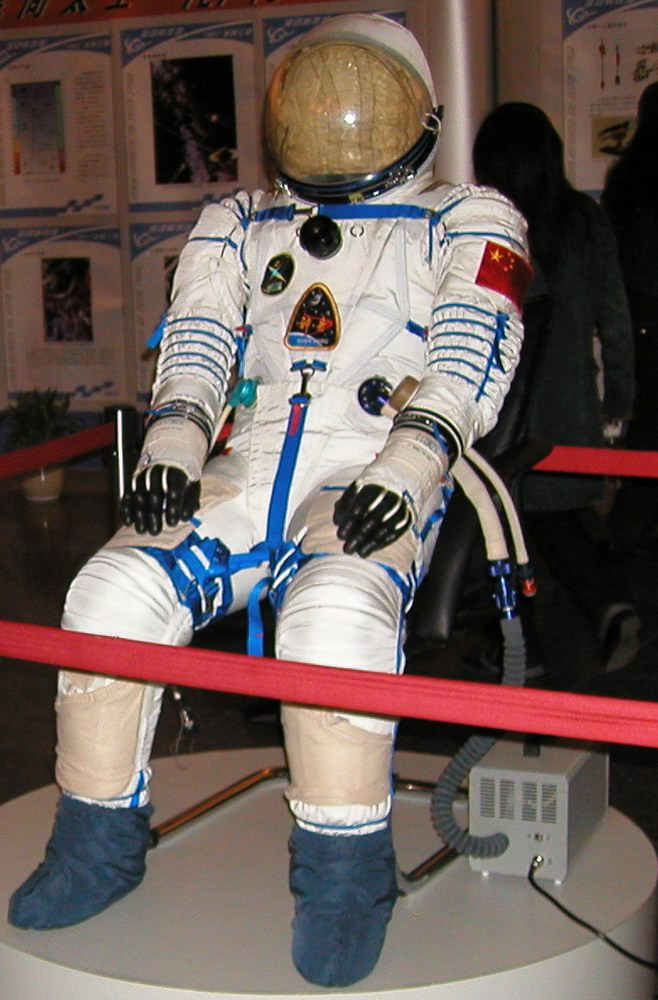
Shenzhou Intra-Vehicular Activity space suit

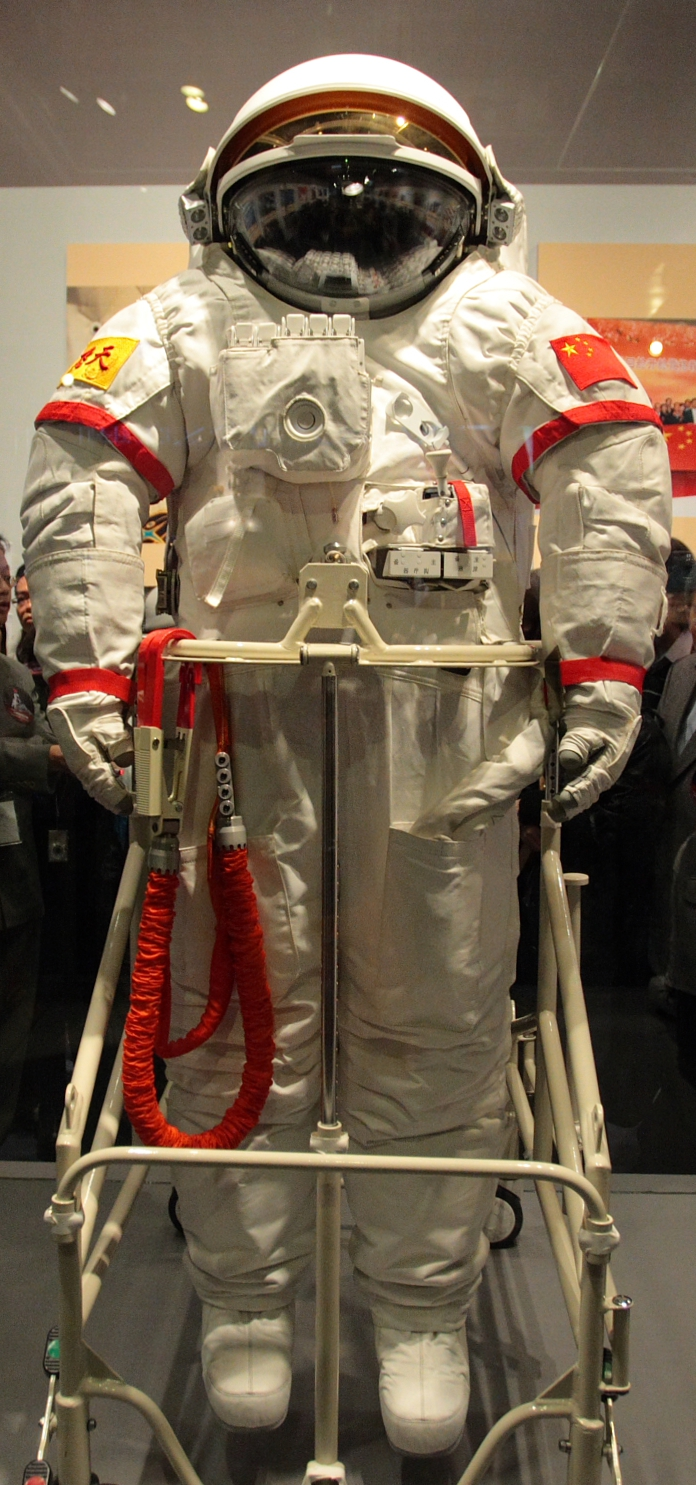
Feitian space suit

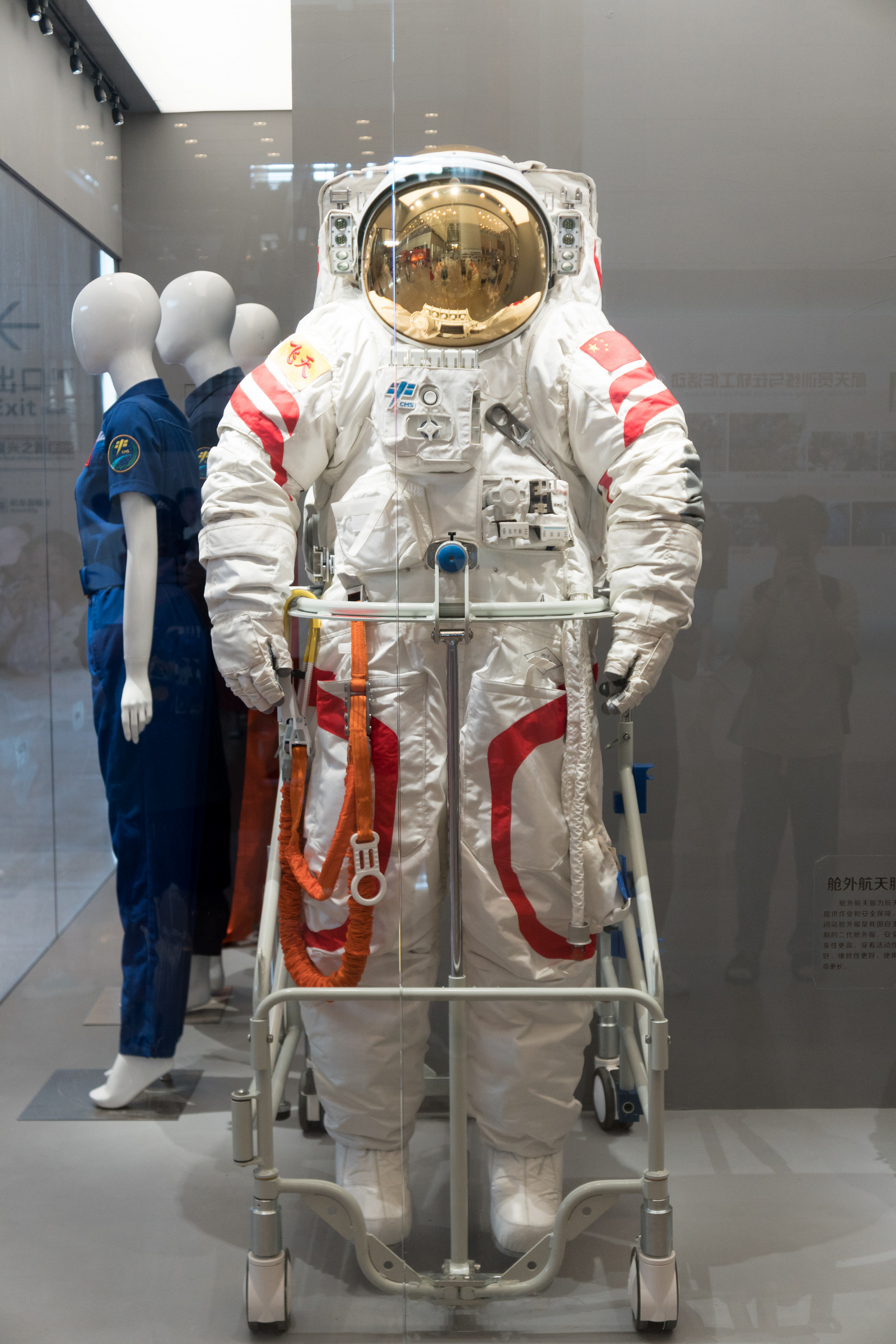
Second generation of Feitian space suit

== Emerging technologies ==
Several companies and universities are developing technologies and prototypes which represent improvements over current space suits.

=== Additive manufacturing ===
3D printing (additive manufacturing) can be used to reduce the mass of hard-shell space suits while retaining the high mobility they provide. This fabrication method also allows for the potential for in-suit fabrication and repair of suits, a capability which is not currently available, but will likely be necessary for Martian exploration. The University of Maryland began development of a prototype 3D printed hard suit in 2016, based on the kinematics of the AX-5. The prototype arm segment is designed to be evaluated in the Space Systems Laboratory glovebox to compare mobility to traditional soft suits. Initial research has focused on the feasibility of printing rigid suit elements, bearing races, ball bearings, seals, and sealing surfaces.

=== Astronaut Glove Challenge ===
There are certain difficulties in designing a dexterous space suit glove and there are limitations to the current designs. For this reason, the Centennial Astronaut Glove Challenge was created to build a better glove. Competitions have been held in 2007 and 2009, and another is planned. The 2009 contest required the glove to be covered with a micro-meteorite layer.

=== Aouda.X ===
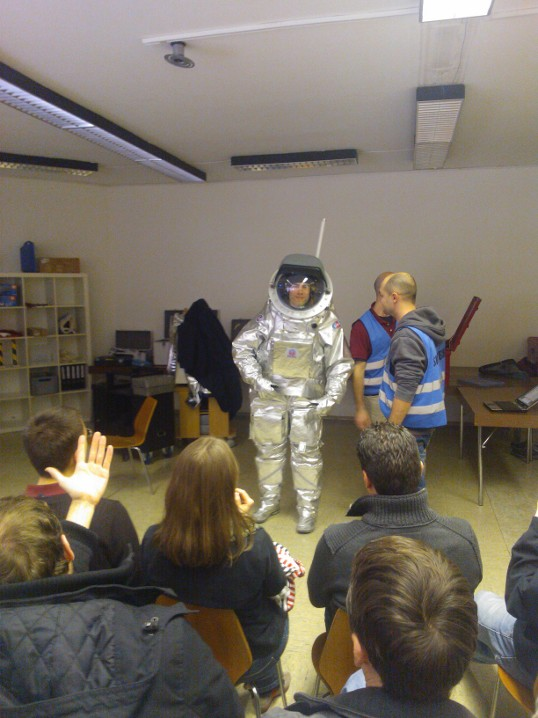
Aouda.X

Since 2009, the Austrian Space Forum has been developing "Aouda.X", an experimental Mars analogue space suit focusing on an advanced human–machine interface and on-board computing network to increase situational awareness. The suit is designed to study contamination vectors in planetary exploration analogue environments and create limitations depending on the pressure regime chosen for a simulation.

Since 2012, for the Mars2013 analogue mission by the Austrian Space Forum to Erfoud, Morocco, the Aouda.X analogue space suit has a sister in the form of Aouda.S. This is a slightly less sophisticated suit meant primarily to assist Aouda.X operations and be able to study the interactions between two (analogue) astronauts in similar suits.

The Aouda.X and Aouda.S space suits have been named after the fictional princess from the Jules Verne's 1873 novel Around the World in Eighty Days. A public display mock-up of Aouda.X (called Aouda.D) is currently on display at the Dachstein Ice Cave in Obertraun, Austria, after the experiments done there in 2012.

=== Axiom Space and Prada ===
In 2024, at the International Astronautical Congress in Milan, Italy, Axiom Space and Prada showed the results of an ongoing collaboration to develop a spacesuit for NASA's Artemis III mission.

=== Bio-Suit ===
Bio-Suit is a space activity suit developed by the Massachusetts Institute of Technology, which consists of 3d-Knit arm sleeves designed to administer uniform skin pressure when worn. Bio-suit is custom fit to each wearer, using laser body scanning.

=== Constellation Space Suit system ===
On August 2, 2006, NASA indicated plans to issue a Request for Proposal (RFP) for the design, development, certification, production, and sustaining engineering of the Constellation Space Suit to meet the needs of the Constellation Program. NASA foresaw a single suit capable of supporting: survivability during launch, entry and abort; zero-gravity EVA; lunar surface EVA; and Mars surface EVA.

On June 11, 2008, NASA awarded a US$745 million contract to Oceaneering International to create the new space suit.

=== Final Frontier Design IVA Space Suit ===
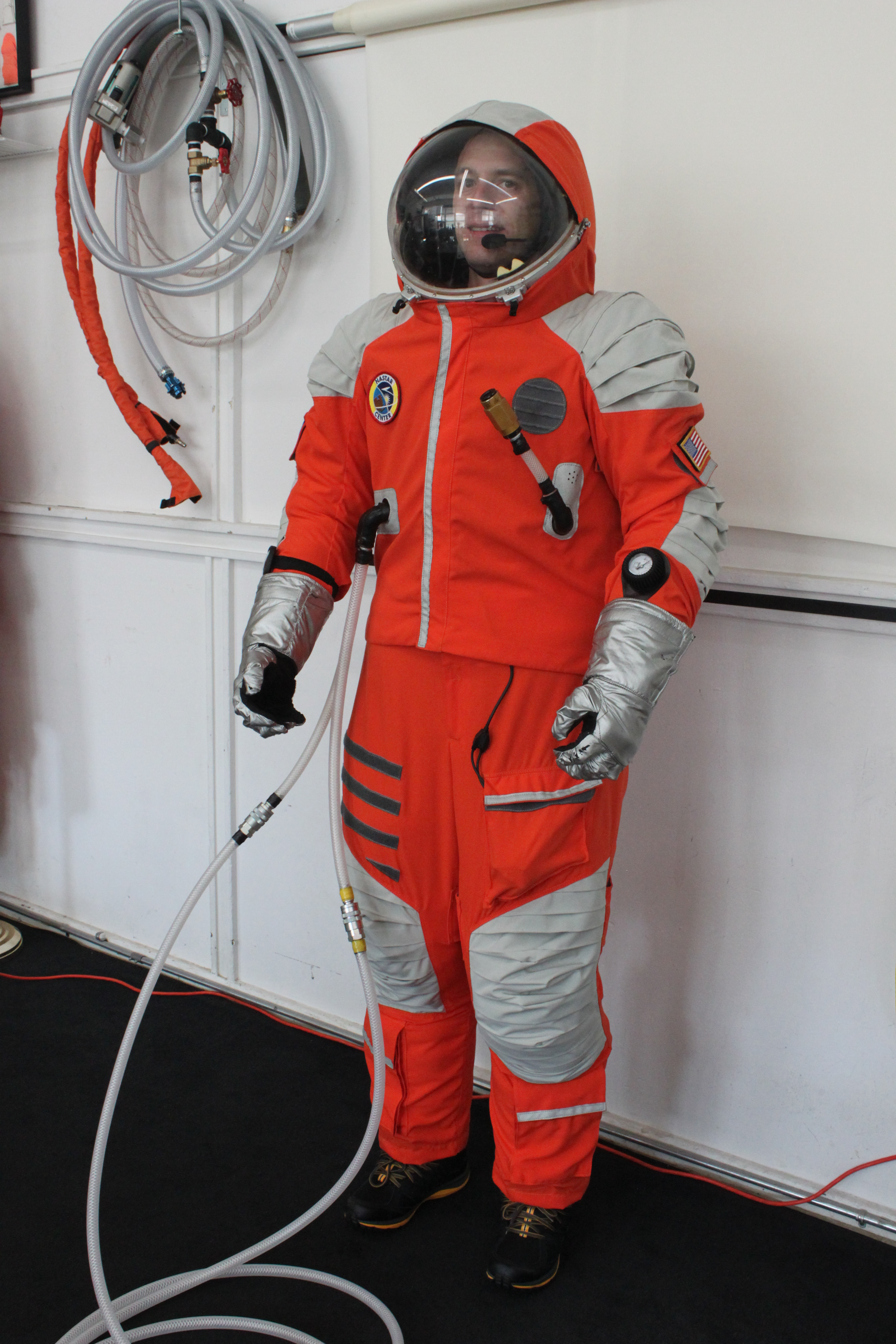
Final Frontier Design IVA Space Suit

Final Frontier Design (FFD) is developing a commercial full IVA space suit, with their first suit completed in 2010. FFD's suits are intended as a light-weight, highly mobile, and inexpensive commercial space suits. Since 2011, FFD has upgraded IVA suit's designs, hardware, processes, and capabilities. FFD has built a total of 7 IVA space suit (2016) assemblies for various institutions and customers since founding, and has conducted high fidelity human testing in simulators, aircraft, microgravity, and hypobaric chambers. FFD has a Space Act Agreement with NASA's Commercial Space Capabilities Office to develop and execute a Human Rating Plan for FFD IVA suit. FFD categorizes their IVA suits according to their mission: Terra for Earth-based testing, Stratos for high altitude flights, and Exos for orbital space flights. Each suit category has different requirements for manufacturing controls, validations, and materials, but are of a similar architecture.

=== I-Suit ===
The I-Suit is a space suit prototype also constructed by ILC Dover, which incorporates several design improvements over the EMU, including a weight-saving soft upper torso. Both the Mark III and the I-Suit have taken part in NASA's annual Desert Research and Technology Studies (D-RATS) field trials, during which suit occupants interact with one another, and with rovers and other equipment.

=== Mark III ===
The Mark III is a NASA prototype, constructed by ILC Dover, which incorporates a hard lower torso section and a mix of soft and hard components. The Mark III is markedly more mobile than previous suits, despite its high operating pressure (57 kPa or 8.3 psi), which makes it a "zero-prebreathe" suit, meaning that astronauts would be able to transition directly from a one-atmosphere, mixed-gas space station environment, such as that on the International Space Station, to the suit, without risking decompression sickness, which can occur with rapid depressurization from an atmosphere containing nitrogen or another inert gas.

=== MX-2 ===
The MX-2 is a space suit analogue constructed at the University of Maryland's Space Systems Laboratory. The MX-2 is used for crewed neutral buoyancy testing at the Space Systems Lab's Neutral Buoyancy Research Facility. By approximating the work envelope of a real EVA suit, without meeting the requirements of a flight-rated suit, the MX-2 provides an inexpensive platform for EVA research, compared to using EMU suits at facilities like NASA's Neutral Buoyancy Laboratory.

The MX-2 has an operating pressure of 2.5–4 psi. It is a rear-entry suit, featuring a fiberglass HUT. Air, LCVG cooling water, and power are open loop systems, provided through an umbilical. The suit contains a Mac Mini computer to capture sensor data, such as suit pressure, inlet and outlet air temperatures, and heart rate. Resizable suit elements and adjustable ballast allow the suit to accommodate subjects ranging in height from 68 to 75 inches (170–190 cm), and with a weight range of 120 lb (54 kg).

=== North Dakota suit ===
Beginning in May 2006, five North Dakota colleges collaborated on a new space suit prototype, funded by a US$100,000 grant from NASA, to demonstrate technologies which could be incorporated into a planetary suit. The suit was tested in the Theodore Roosevelt National Park badlands of western North Dakota. The suit has a mass of 47 pounds (21 kg) without a life support backpack, and costs only a fraction of the standard US$12,000,000 cost for a flight-rated NASA space suit. The suit was developed in just over a year by students from the University of North Dakota, North Dakota State, Dickinson State, the state College of Science and Turtle Mountain Community College. The mobility of the North Dakota suit can be attributed to its low operating pressure; while the North Dakota suit was field tested at a pressure of 1 psi (6.9 kPa; 52 Torr) differential, NASA's EMU suit operates at a pressure of 4.7 psi (32 kPa; 240 Torr), a pressure designed to supply approximately sea-level oxygen partial pressure for respiration (see discussion above).

=== PXS ===
NASA's Prototype eXploration Suit (PXS), like the Z-series, is a rear-entry suit compatible with suitports. The suit has components which could be 3D printed during missions to a range of specifications, to fit different individuals or changing mobility requirements.

=== Suitports ===
A suitport is a theoretical alternative to an airlock, designed for use in hazardous environments and in human spaceflight, especially planetary surface exploration. In a suitport system, a rear-entry space suit is attached and sealed against the outside of a spacecraft, such that an astronaut can enter and seal up the suit, then go on EVA, without the need for an airlock or depressurizing the spacecraft cabin. Suitports require less mass and volume than airlocks, provide dust mitigation, and prevent cross-contamination of the inside and outside environments. Patents for suitport designs were filed in 1996 by Philip Culbertson Jr. of NASA's Ames Research Center and in 2003 by Joerg Boettcher, Stephen Ransom, and Frank Steinsiek.

=== Z-series ===
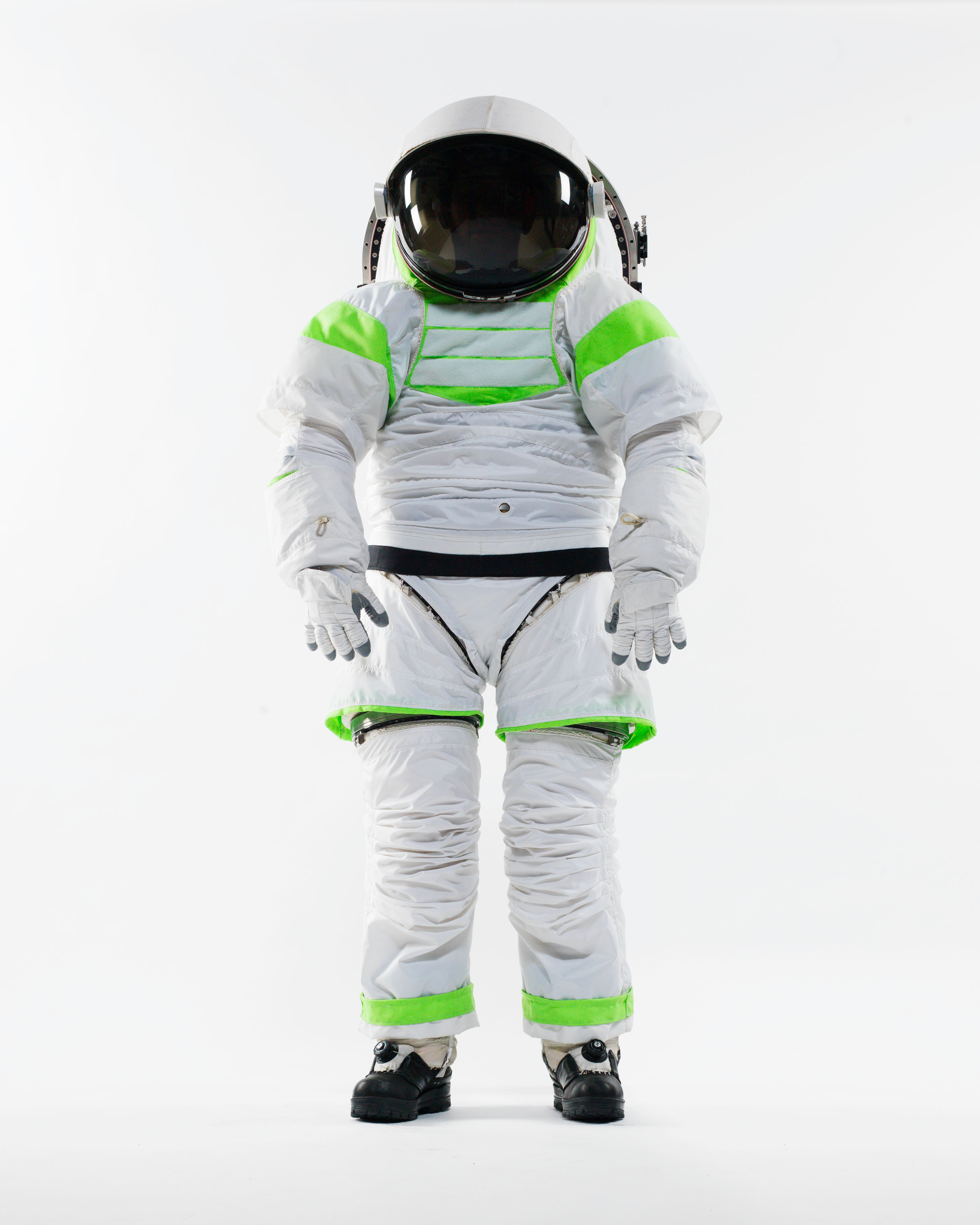
Z-1 Series Suit

In 2012, NASA introduced the Z-1 space suit, the first in the Z-series of space suit prototypes designed by NASA specifically for planetary extravehicular activity. The Z-1 space suit includes an emphasis on mobility and protection for space missions. It features a soft torso versus the hard torsos seen in previous NASA EVA space suits, which reduces mass. It has been labeled the "Buzz Lightyear suit" due to its green streaks for a design.

In 2014, NASA released the design for the Z-2 prototype, the next model in the Z-series. NASA conducted a poll asking the public to decide on a design for the Z-2 space suit. The designs, created by fashion students from Philadelphia University, were "Technology", "Trends in Society", and "Biomimicry". The design "Technology" won, and the prototype is built with technologies like 3D printing. The Z-2 suit will also differ from the Z-1 suit in that the torso reverts to the hard shell, as seen in NASA's EMU suit.

=== EuroSuit ===
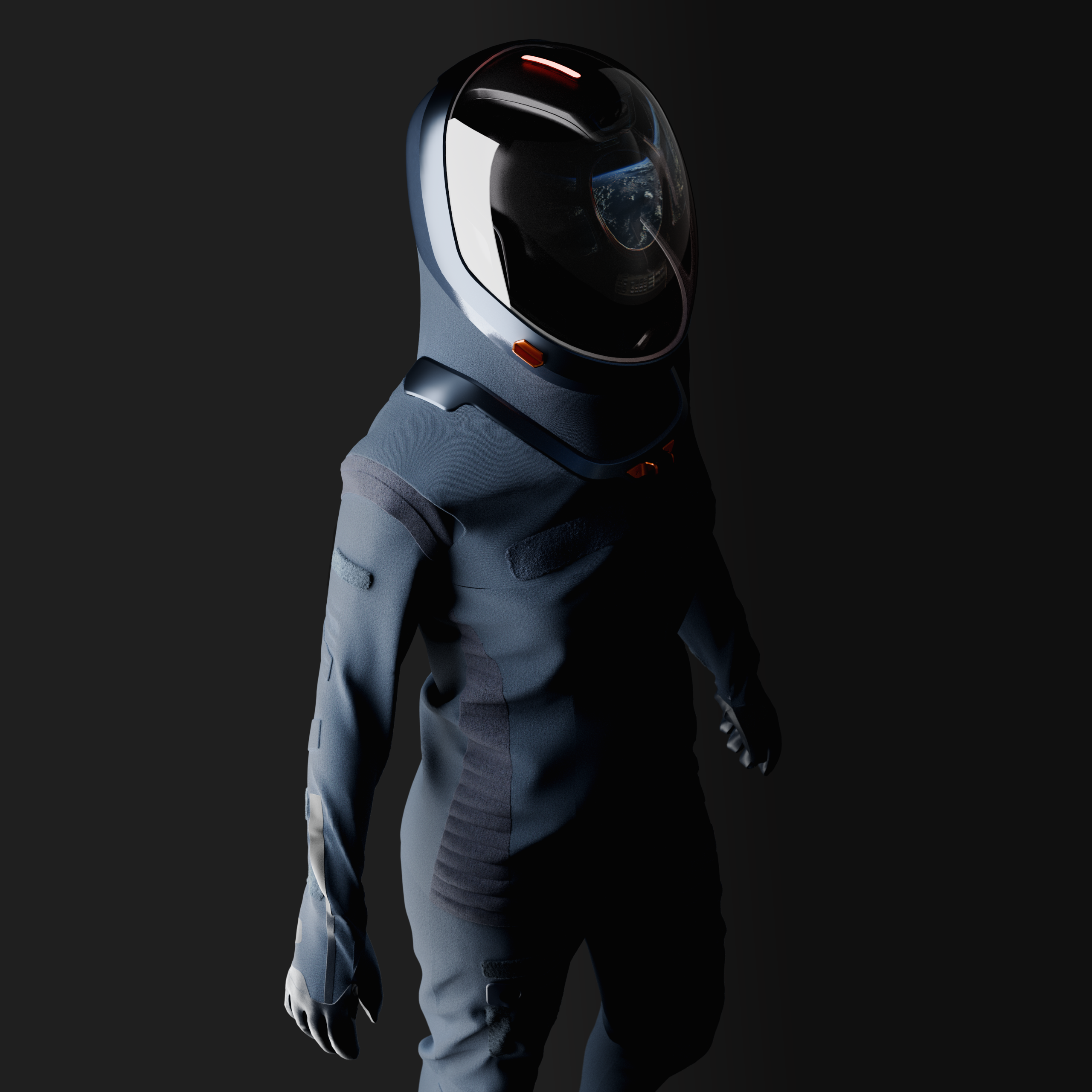
First intra-vehicular Space Suit Prototype developed by CNES, Spartan Space, Medes and Decathlon

In 2023, CNES contracted with Spartan Space to develop a European IVA spacesuit named EuroSuit, with plans to test it on the ISS in 2026. In 2026, French astronaut Sophie Adenot launched on SpaceX Crew-12 with a prototype of the space suit to be tested on board the ISS.

== In fiction ==
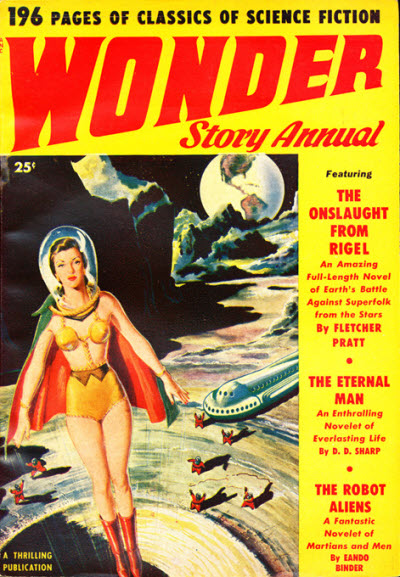
1950 issue of Wonder Story Annual with a woman wearing a spacesuit on the cover

Space suits are a common staple of science fiction. They appeared in science fiction works as early as 19th century (Jules Verne's From the Earth to the Moon, 1865).

== See also ==
- Mechanical counterpressure suit – Spacesuit providing mechanical pressure using elastic garments
- Atmospheric diving suit – Articulated pressure-resistant anthropomorphic housing for an underwater diver
- Breathing apparatus – Equipment allowing or assisting the user to breathe in a hostile environment
- High altitude breathing apparatus – Equipment which allows the user to breathe at hypoxic altitudes
- Effect of spaceflight on the human body – Medical issues associated with spaceflight
- Extravehicular activity – Activity done by an astronaut outside a spacecraft
  - By era:
    - List of spacewalks and moonwalks 1965–1999
    - List of spacewalks 2000–2014
    - List of spacewalks since 2015, Astronauts walking in space to date
  - By station:
    - List of Mir spacewalks
    - List of International Space Station spacewalks – Extravehicular activities outside the orbiting lab
  - List of cumulative spacewalk records
- Manned Maneuvering Unit – NASA astronaut propulsion unit
- Life support in aviation

== Bibliography ==
- Abramov, Isaac P.; Skoog, Å. Ingemar; et al. (2003). Russian Spacesuits. London; New York: Springer-Verlag. ISBN 1-85233-732-X. LCCN 2003045585. OCLC 51922847.
- de Monchaux, Nicholas (2011). Spacesuit: Fashioning Apollo. MIT Press. ISBN 978-0-262-01520-2.
- Kozloski, Lillian D. (1994). U.S. Space Gear: Outfitting The Astronaut. Washington, D.C.: Smithsonian Institution Press. ISBN 0-87474-459-8. LCCN 92-34611. OCLC 623508754.
- Seedhouse, Erik (2010). The New Space Race: China vs. the United States. Berlin; New York: Springer. ISBN 978-1-4419-0879-7. LCCN 2009936076. OCLC 695700526.
- Thomas, Kenneth S.; McMann, Harold J. (2006). US Spacesuits. Berlin; New York: Springer-Verlag. ISBN 0-387-27919-9. LCCN 2005929632. OCLC 61477760.
- Young, Amanda (2009). Spacesuits: The Smithsonian National Air and Space Museum Collection. Photographs by Mark Avino; introduction by Allan Needell; foreword by Thomas P. Stafford (1st ed.). Brooklyn, NY: powerHouse Books. ISBN 978-1-576-87498-1. LCCN 2009075080. OCLC 276334393.
