= Gemini spacesuit =

Pressurized spacesuit used in the Gemini program

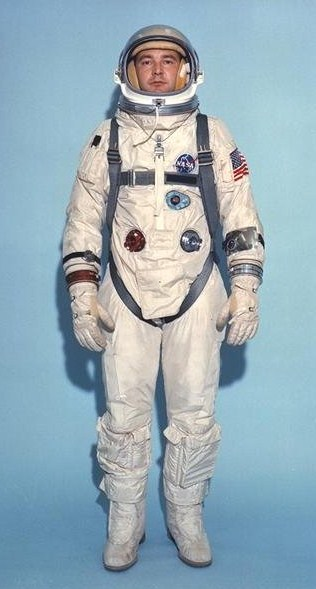
Gemini spacesuit

The Gemini spacesuit is a spacesuit worn by American astronauts for launch, in-flight activities (including EVAs) and landing. It was designed by NASA based on the X-15 high-altitude pressure suit. All Gemini spacesuits were developed and manufactured by the David Clark Company in Worcester, Massachusetts.

== G3C and G4C suits ==
The G3C and G4C suits were the primary spacesuits worn for all but the Gemini 7 mission. The G3C consisted of six layers of nylon (the innermost containing a rubberized nylon "bladder") and Nomex, with a link net retaining layer and an outer layer of white Nomex fabric. It had removable combat-style boots, also made of Nomex fabric, along with a full-pressure helmet (containing a set of earphones and microphones) and gloves detachable by improved locking rings that allowed easy rotation of the wrists. On Gemini 3, the G3C suit was worn by both Gus Grissom and John W. Young and was the only flight to use this suit.

The G4C suit was identical to the G3C suit, but came in two different styles. Both had additional layers of Mylar insulation for temperature control (250 °F (121 °C) in direct sunlight and −250 °F (−157 °C) in shadow), but the commander's suit retained the removable boots, while the pilot's version had integrated boots and a detachable sun visor which clipped onto the helmet. The G4C suit was worn by all subsequent Gemini crews from Gemini 4 to Gemini 12 (except for Gemini 7) and it was in this suit that Ed White made the first American spacewalk in 1965. A further modification, the incorporation of additional layers in the legs, as well as an outer layer of Chromel-R fabric, was made to the EVA suit worn by Eugene Cernan on Gemini 9A, to accommodate a planned test of the Air Force Astronaut Maneuvering Unit (AMU). On this version, the Plexiglas helmet faceplate was replaced with one made of higher strength polycarbonate plastic. This version was also worn by Buzz Aldrin on Gemini 12 for a similar AMU test, though this test was canceled two months before the mission.

== G5C suits ==
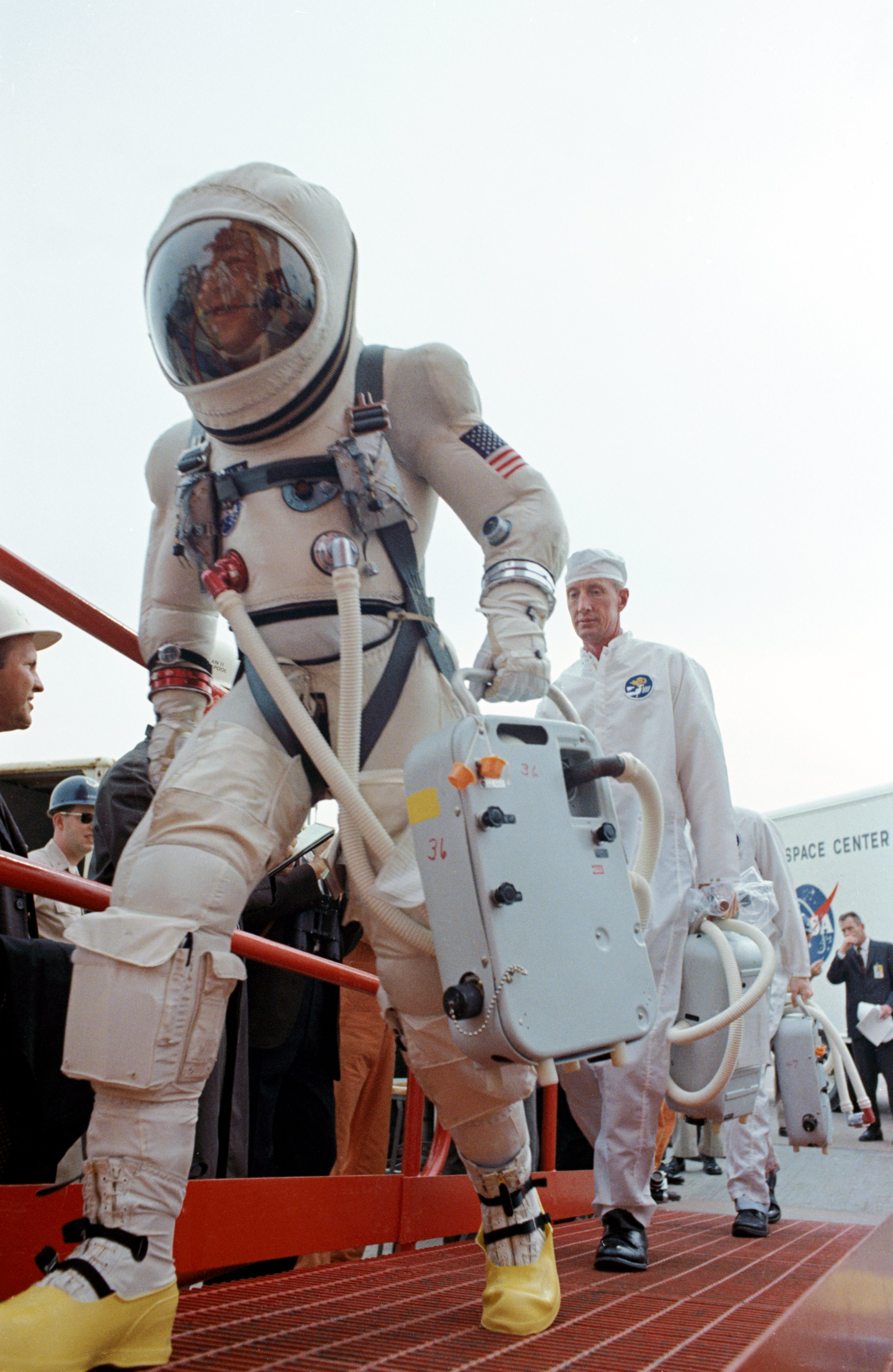
G5C spacesuit

For the 14-day Gemini 7 mission, both Frank Borman and Jim Lovell wore modified G3C suits, but incorporating several changes:

- Replacement of the pressure helmet and neck ring with a zippered hood incorporating a clear, fixed polycarbonate visor, with the astronauts wearing modified Navy-style aviator crash helmets that incorporated the communication equipment (microphones and earphones).
- Additional zippers for in-flight adjustment, along with provisions for complete removal of the suit.

This configuration was designated the G5C suit. During the mission, Lovell was the first person to take his pressure suit off, which was achieved with great difficulty due to his size. Borman later was able to get his suit off, and biomedical data collected during the flight confirmed that astronauts would be more comfortable during Apollo lunar flights in a shirt-sleeve environment, wearing flight suits during "non-critical" phases of the mission. This led to the wearing of such flight suits from Apollo 7 to the present day. The G5C suit somewhat resembles the current Soyuz Sokol pressure suits worn by Russian-launched ISS crews.

== Apollo program ==
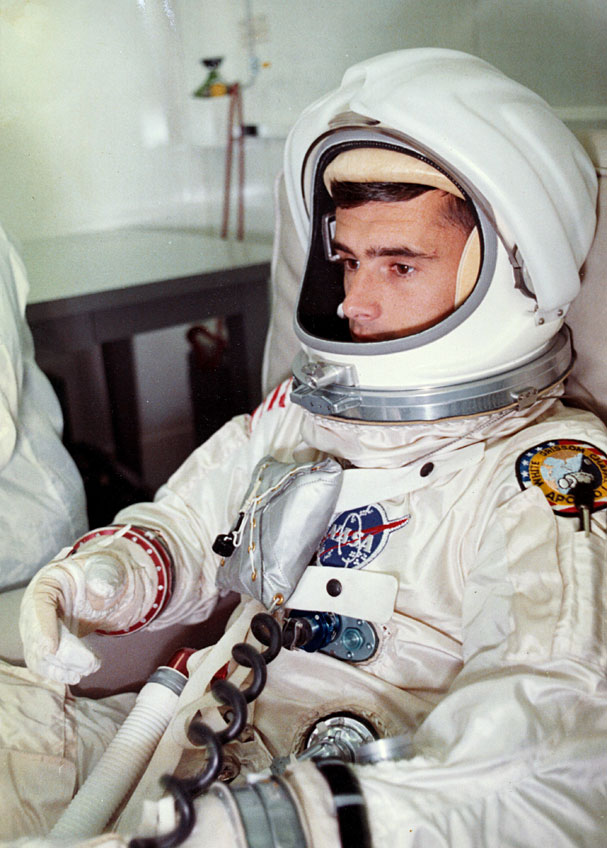
Roger B. Chaffee wears the Apollo Block I pressure suit

The Gemini spacesuit was chosen by NASA for the initial Apollo Block I Earth orbital concept demonstrator phase of Apollo. Since EVA was impractical due to the hatch design of the Block I spacecraft, and with a design competition underway between ILC Dover, Hamilton Standard (later Hamilton Sunstrand), and David Clark for a new Block II lunar EVA suit, NASA decided to use the G3C as the base for the Apollo Block I suit, designated A1C. This version added new electrical and environmental disconnects, and a protective shell over the helmet visor, which reverted to the more economical Plexiglas. Since Apollo would use a launch escape system in place of Gemini's ejection seats, a yellow-colored U-shaped inflatable "Mae West" personal flotation device replaced the pilot parachute and its harness. Only two Block I flights were initially planned until December 1966, when the second one, to be flown by Wally Schirra, Donn F. Eisele, and Walter Cunningham, was canceled as unnecessary duplication.

Astronauts Grissom, White, and Roger B. Chaffee were wearing A1C suits on January 27, 1967 in a preliminary countdown demonstration test for the planned February 21 Apollo 1 launch, when they were killed in a cabin fire, leading to NASA cancelling crewed Block I flights and use of the A1C suit. Since the fire had burned through the suits, NASA added a fireproofing requirement to the new suit, which replaced the outer layer with beta cloth. The Block II suit was designated A7L and manufactured by ILC Dover. The new suit was first used on Apollo 1's replacement flight, Apollo 7 flown by Schirra, Eisele and Cunningham in October 1968.

== Post-Apollo applications ==
The Gemini suit was looked at for the Manned Orbiting Laboratory program (canceled in 1969), and has since been used as the baseline for all high-altitude pressure suits worn by U.S. Air Force pilots, including for the U-2 and SR-71. It was also the basis for NASA's Advance Crew Escape System (ACES) pressure suit. On June 11, 2008, the David Clark Company was selected by the Houston, Texas-based Oceaneering International as a subcontractor for the manufacture of the new Constellation Space Suit system, in which its "Operation One" configuration, resembles the current ACES suit, but functions in the same manner as that of the Gemini suit.

== Specifications ==
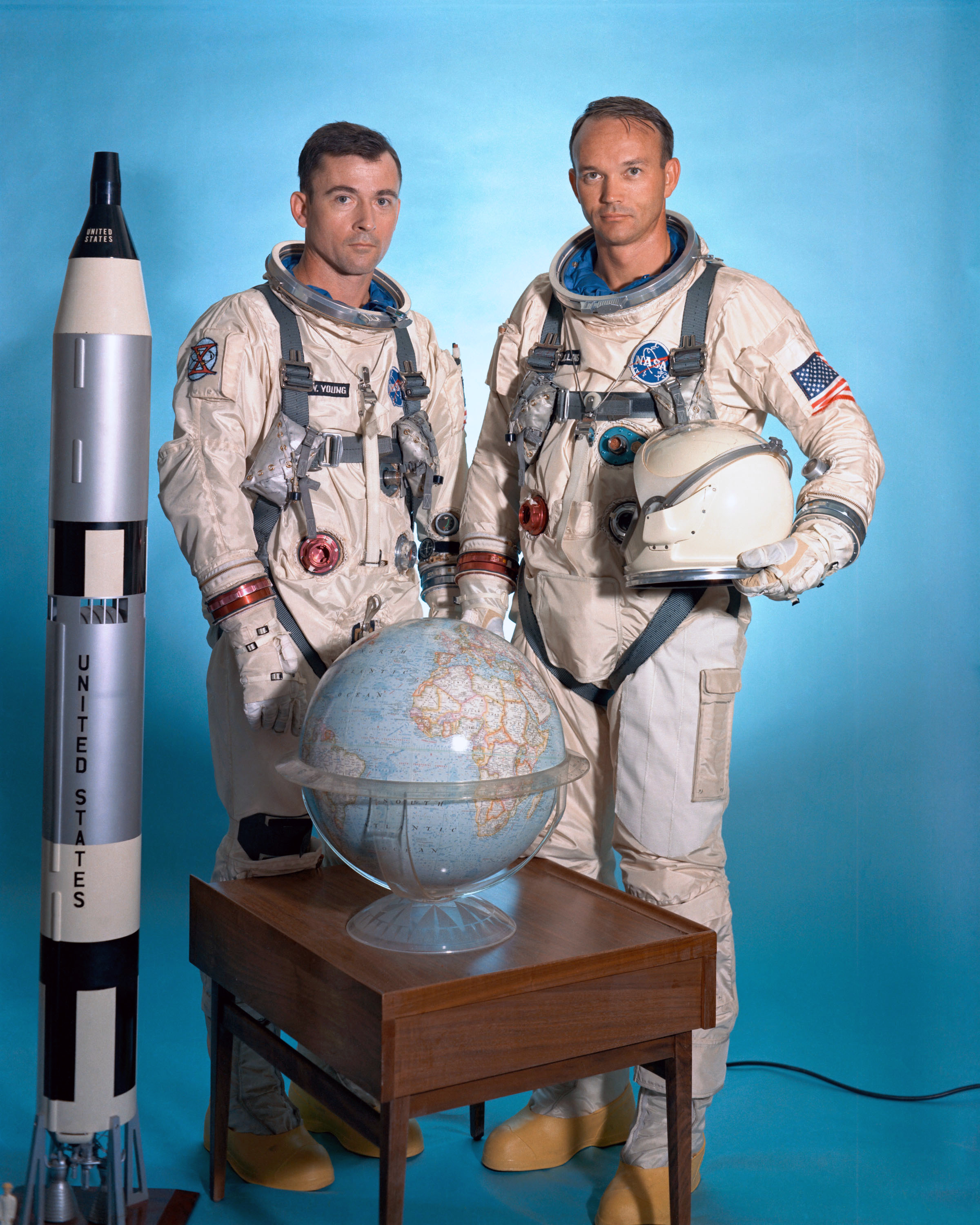
G4C spacesuits, Gemini 10 (John Young, Michael Collins)

The suit family system included both parachute and flotation systems. For EVAs Gemini 4 used the Ventilation Control Module (VCM), for Gemini 8-12 the Extravehicular Life Support System (ELSS) was used. The ELSS was also designed to optionally supply autonomous life support though they never made it to EVA. Two oxygen supply packs were developed for it. One was the Extravehicular Support Package (ESP) (providing an hour's worth of life support), carried aboard Gemini 8 but not used, and the other for the Astronaut Maneuvering Unit (providing an hour's worth of life support), carried on-board Gemini 9 and to fly while tethered but was not used. The AMU was also meant to be launched and flown on-board Gemini 12, and to fly untethered from the Gemini spacecraft, but was scrubbed two months before the mission.

Gemini spacesuit specifications
	Gemini G3C Spacesuit	Gemini G4C Spacesuit	Gemini G5C Spacesuit	Apollo A1C Spacesuit
Manufacturer	David Clark Company			
Missions	Gemini 3; Gemini 6 (Schirra); Gemini 8 (Armstrong)	Gemini 4–6, 8–12	Gemini 7	Apollo 1 (failed); AS-205 (canceled)
Ejection	✓	✓	✓	✗
Intra-vehicular activity (IVA)	✓	✓	✓	✓
Extra-vehicular activity (EVA)	✗	✓	✗	✗
Operating pressure	3.7 psi (26 kPa)			
Suit weight	23.5 lb (10.7 kg)	34 lb (15.4 kg) ^{[†]}	16 lb (7.3 kg)	
Primary life support	Vehicle provided			
Backup life support	Vehicle provided	Gemini 4: 9 minutes; Gemini 5, 6, 8–12: 30 minutes	Vehicle provided	Vehicle provided
Notes	^{[†]}: Ventilation Control Module (VCM) (Gemini 4): 7.75 lb (3.5 kg); Extravehicular Life Support System (ELSS) (Gemini 8–12): 47 lb (21.3 kg)			

== Gemini suit family ==
Gemini suit evolution is listed below.

Gemini suit family

G3C (Gemini III)
G4C (Gemini IV, V, VI-A)	G5C (Gemini VII)	A1C (Apollo 1)
G4C Gemini VIII Variant
G4C Gemini X Variant	G4C Gemini IX-A Variant
G4C Gemini XI Variant	G4C Gemini XII Variant

== Images ==
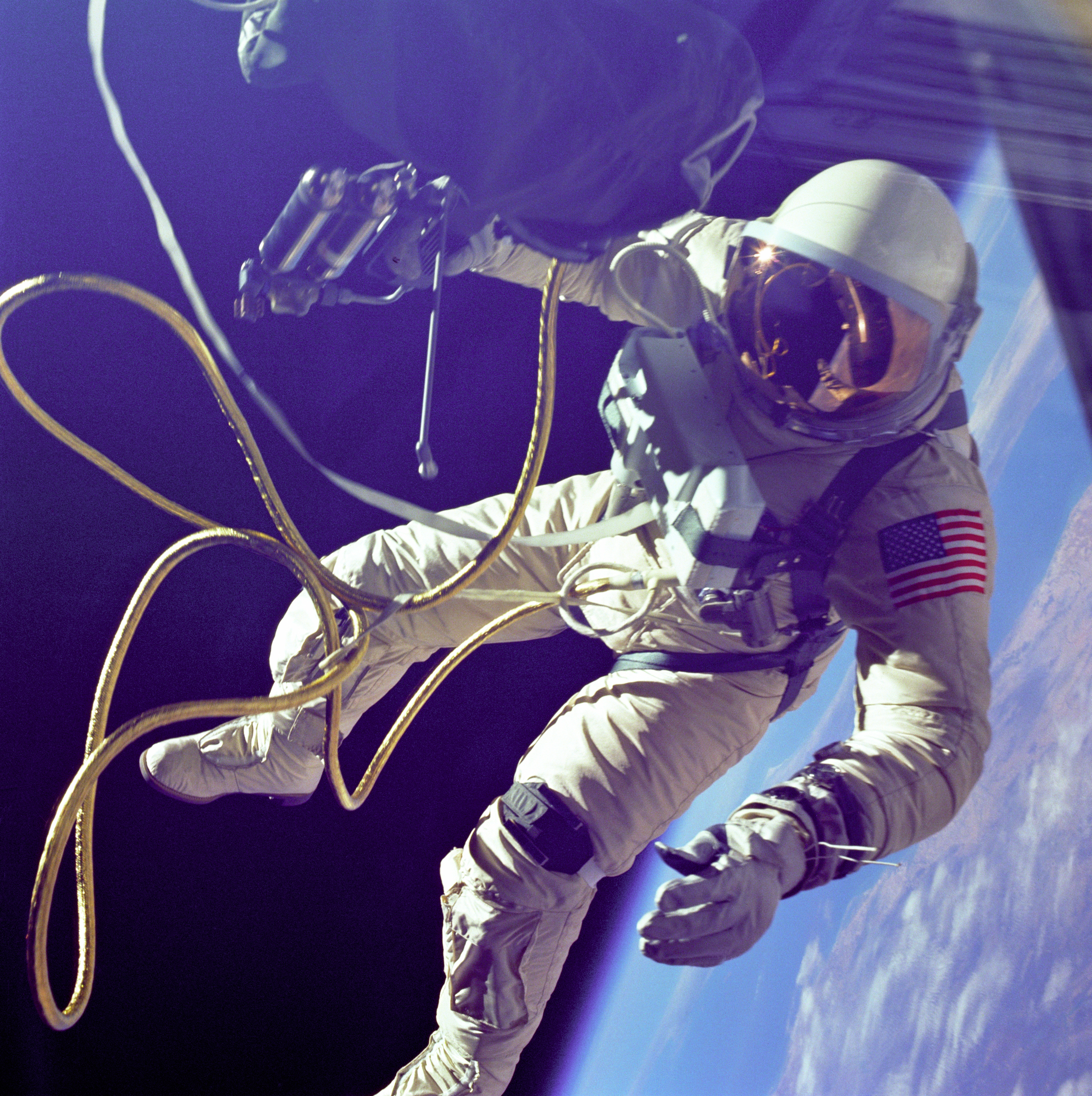
G4C with VCM on chest

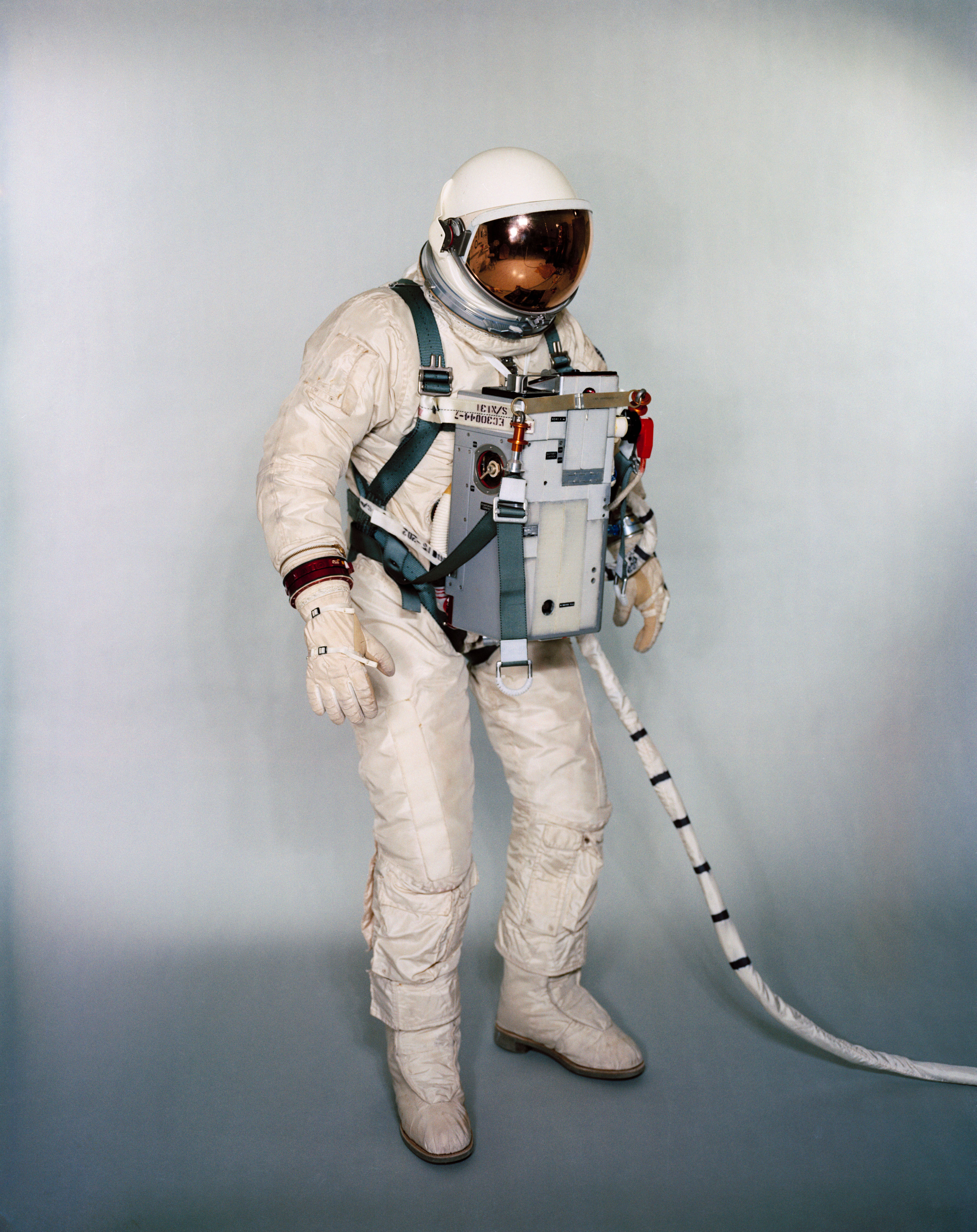
G4C with ELSS on chest

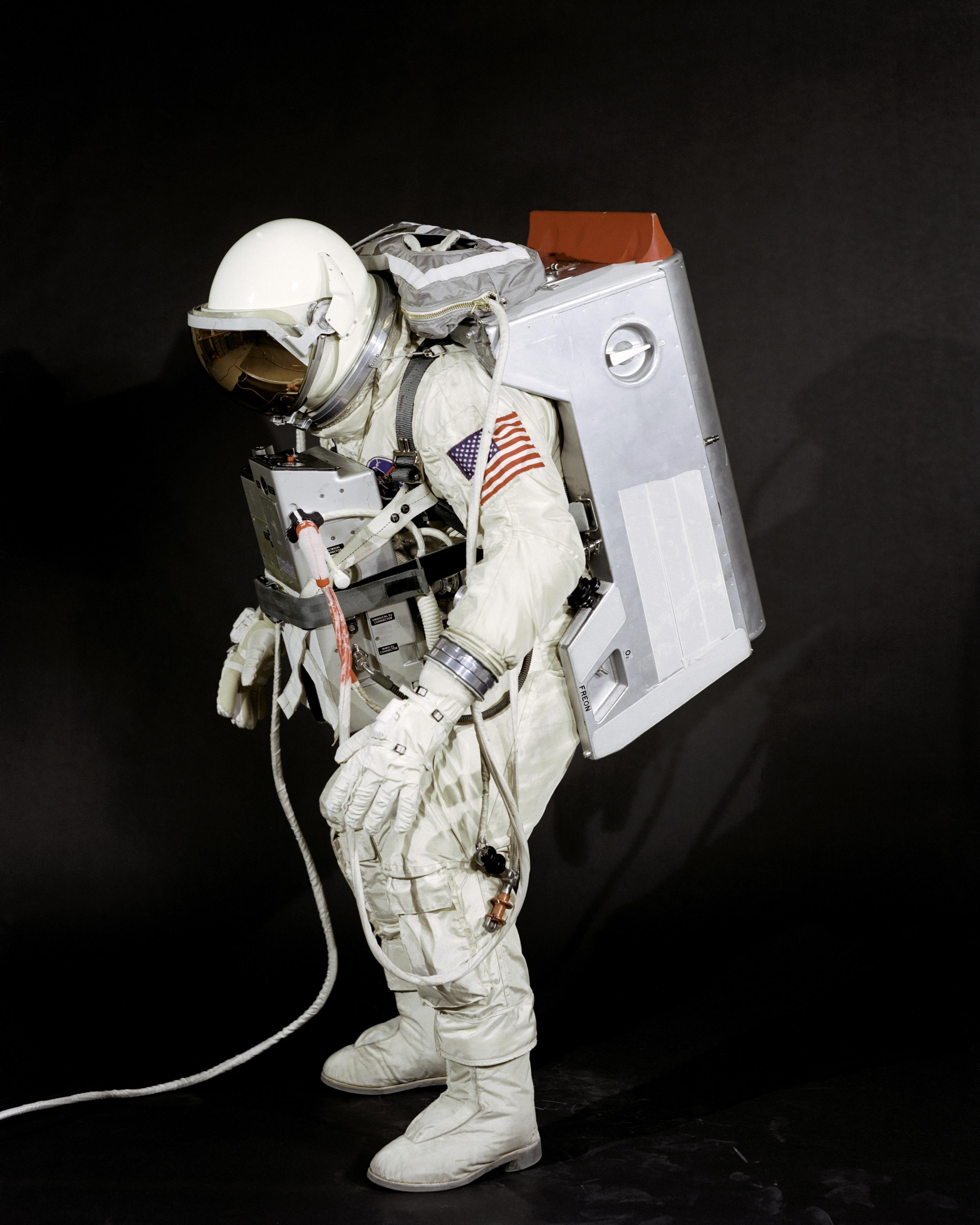
G4C with ELSS on chest and ESP on back

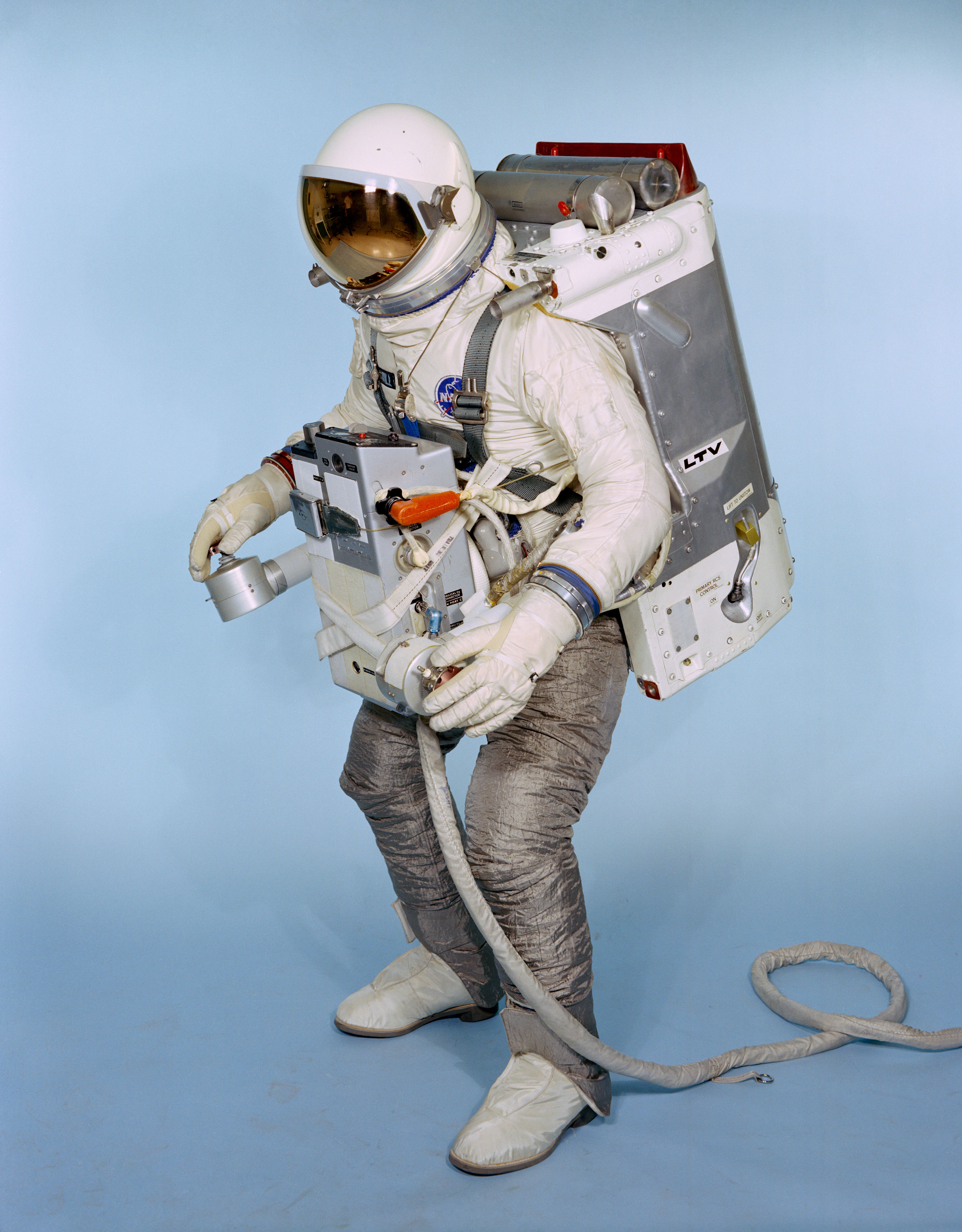
G4C with ELSS on chest and AMU on back

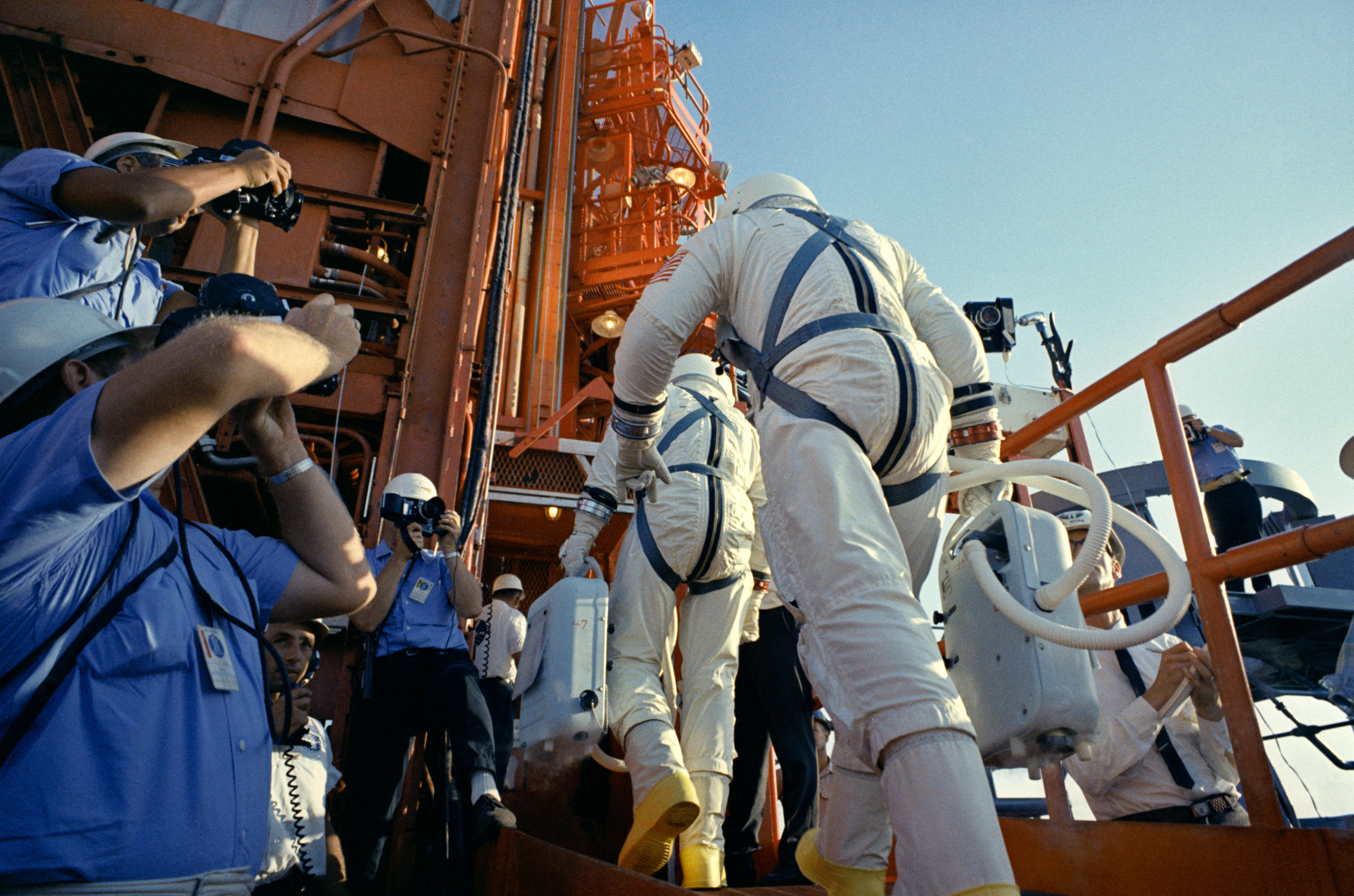
View of G4C Suits entry zipper
