= International orange =

Shade of the color orange

International orange is a color used in the aerospace industry and maritime industry to set objects apart from their surroundings, similar to safety orange, but deeper and with a more reddish tone.

== Variations ==
There are several variants of international orange.

International Orange
(Engineering)
#BA160C

International Orange
(Golden Gate Bridge)
#F04A00

International Orange
(Aerospace)
#FF4F00

=== Aerospace ===
International Orange (Aerospace)

Color coordinates
- Hex triplet: #FF4F00
- sRGB^{B} (r, g, b): (255, 79, 0)
- HSV (h, s, v): (19°, 100%, 100%)
- CIELCh_{uv} (L, C, h): (59, 152, 18°)
- ISCC–NBS descriptor: Vivid reddish orange
- B: Normalized to [0–255] (byte)

The Advanced Crew Escape Suits pressure suits worn by NASA astronauts and the previous Launch Entry Suit use this color, as opposed to the lighter tone of safety orange used by the United States Air Force's high-altitude suits. This was also planned for the Constellation Space Suit systems that were to be flight-ready by 2015.

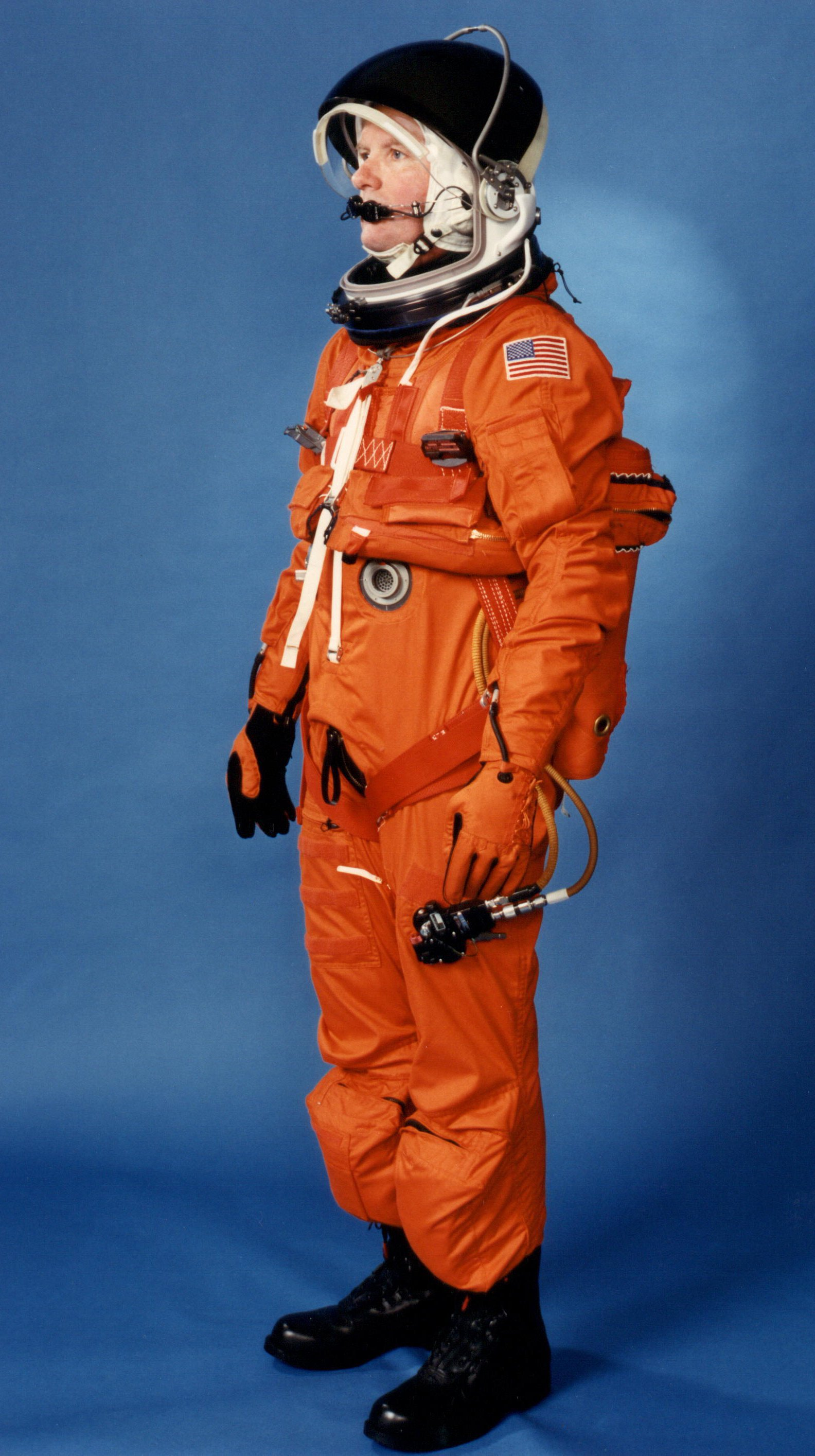
The NASA Launch Entry Suit worn by Space Shuttle astronauts on launch and re-entry

The Bell X-1, the first airplane to break the sound barrier, was also painted in International Orange.

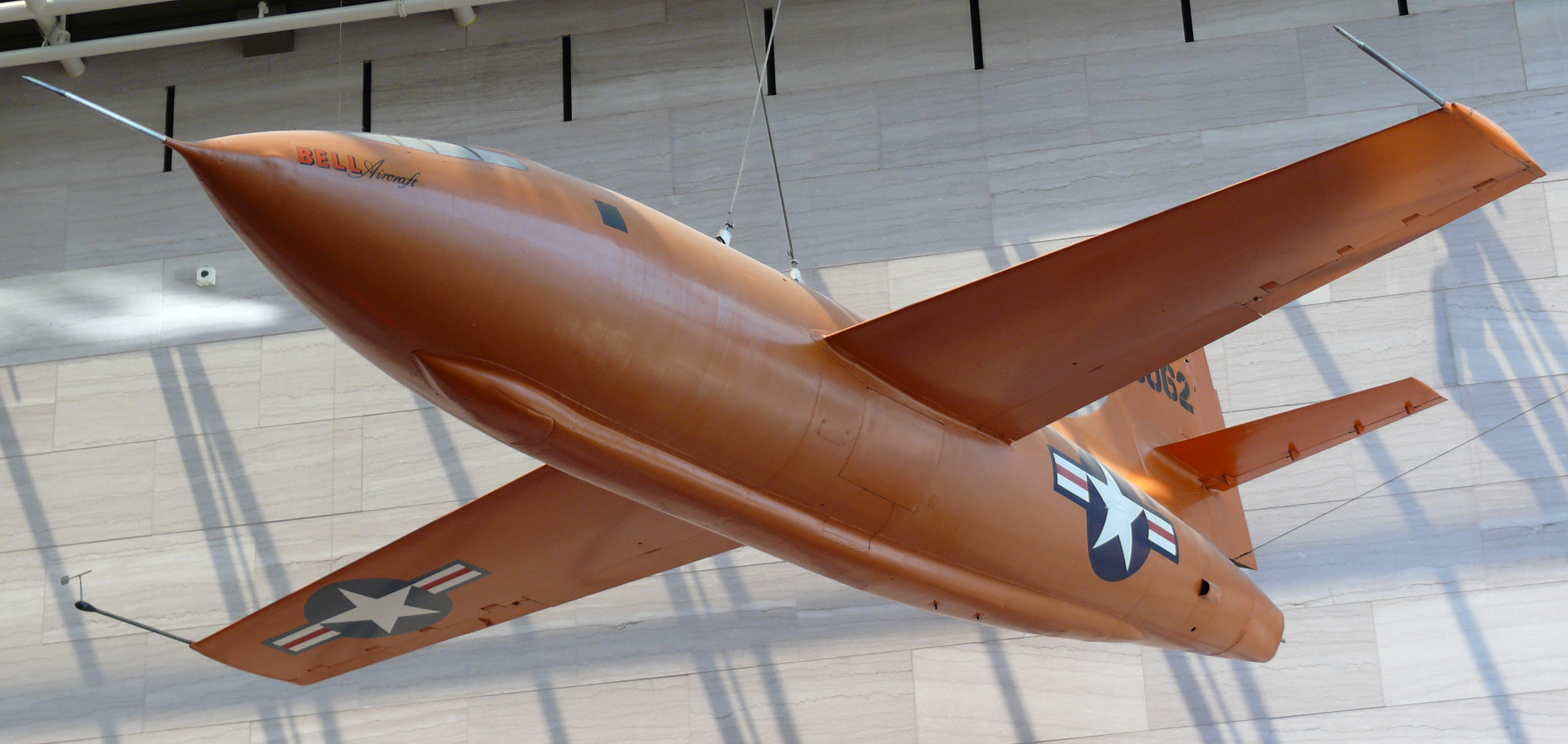
The Bell X-1

=== Golden Gate Bridge ===
International Orange (Golden Gate Bridge)

Color coordinates
- Hex triplet: #F04A00
- sRGB^{B} (r, g, b): (240, 74, 0)
- HSV (h, s, v): (18°, 100%, 94%)
- CIELCh_{uv} (L, C, h): (56, 143, 18°)
- ISCC–NBS descriptor: Vivid reddish orange
- B: Normalized to [0–255] (byte)

The tone of international orange used to paint the Golden Gate Bridge in San Francisco, California is slightly lighter than the standard international orange used by military contractors and in engineering, thus increasing its visibility to ships, but darker than the one used in aerospace. The international orange paint used on the Golden Gate Bridge is specially formulated to protect the bridge from the danger of rust from salt spray off the ocean, and from the moisture of the San Francisco fog that frequently rolls in from the Pacific Ocean through the Golden Gate to San Francisco Bay. The 25 de Abril Bridge in Lisbon, Portugal also uses this color.

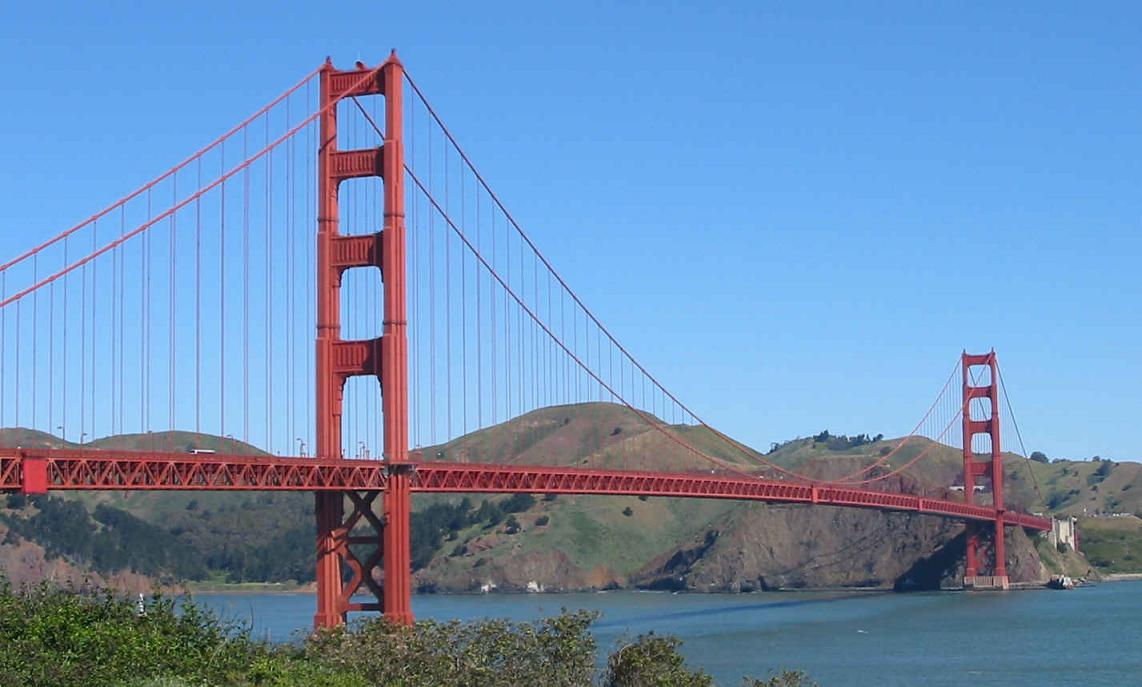
The Golden Gate Bridge

The 25 de Abril Bridge

=== Engineering ===
International Orange (Engineering)

Color coordinates
- Hex triplet: #BA160C
- sRGB^{B} (r, g, b): (186, 22, 12)
- HSV (h, s, v): (3°, 94%, 73%)
- CIELCh_{uv} (L, C, h): (40, 124, 13°)
- Source: FedStd 595
- ISCC–NBS descriptor: Vivid red
- B: Normalized to [0–255] (byte)

The adjacent box displays the generic, red tone of international orange used by military contractors and in engineering generally.

The source of this color is Federal Standard 595, a U.S. federal government standard set up in 1956 for paint colors which is mostly used by military contractors and also in engineering. International Orange is designated as Federal Standard 595 color #FS 12197.

In accordance with air safety regulations, some tall towers, e.g. Tokyo Tower and the Yerevan TV Tower, are painted in white and international orange.

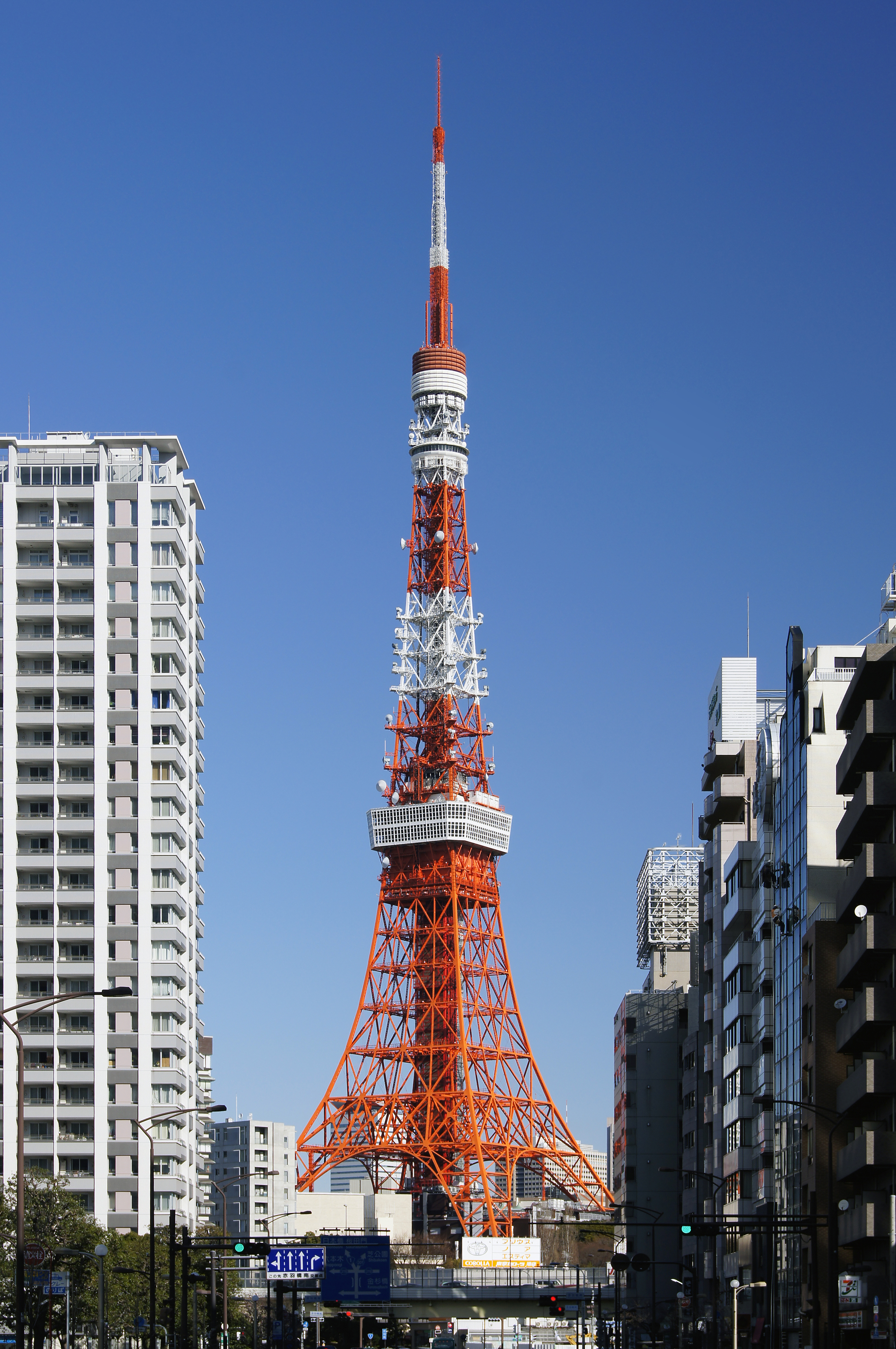
Tokyo Tower in Tokyo, Japan

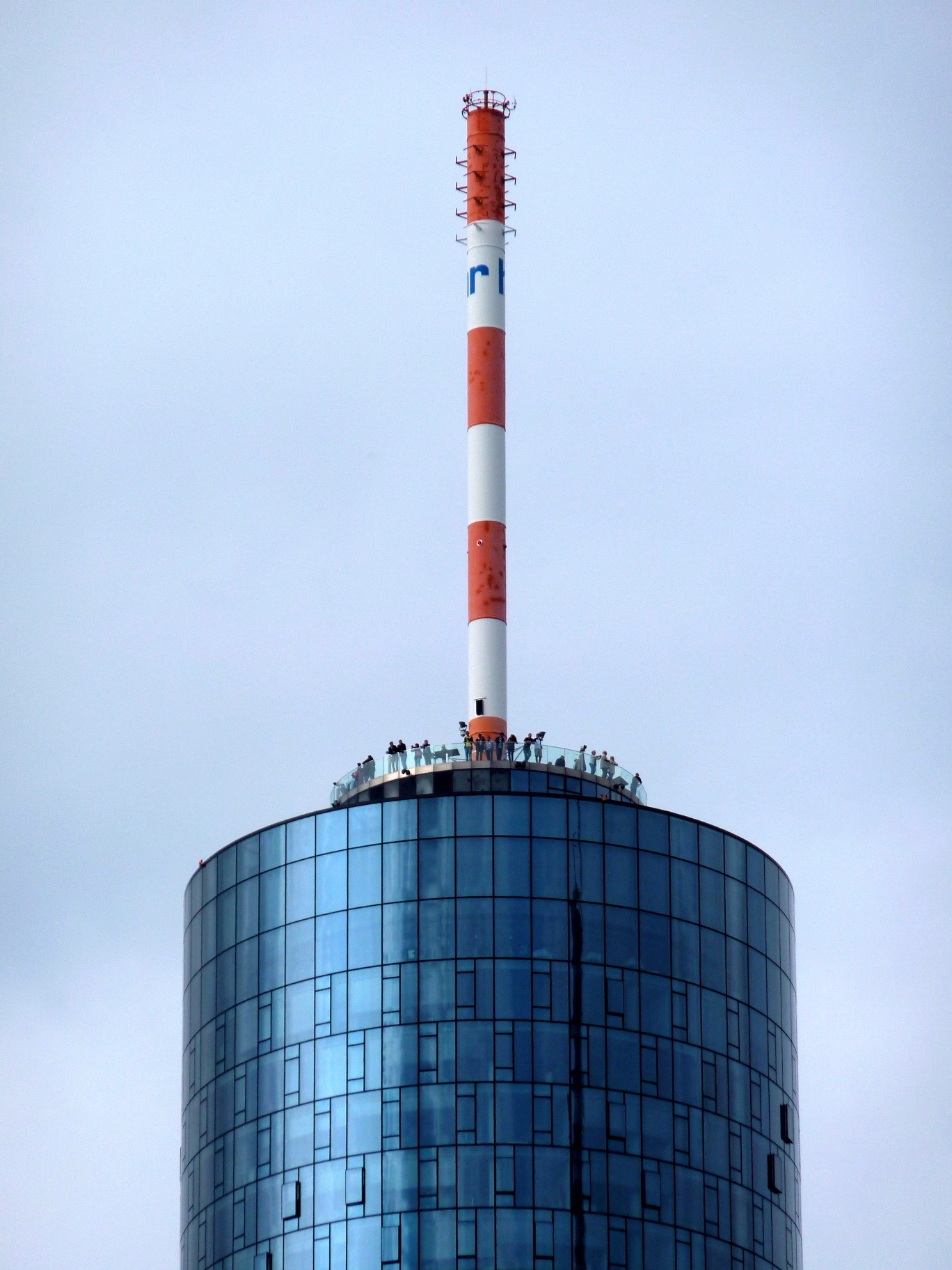
Antenna atop the Main Tower in Frankfurt, Germany

=== Sports ===
The World Football League used international orange (instead of the traditional white) for the stripes on their footballs. The league also painted a short international orange mark on the field at the two-yard line.

=== Trucking ===
Schneider National paints its trucks, tractors, and trailers "international safety orange" (Omaha orange, PMS 165).

=== Maritime ===
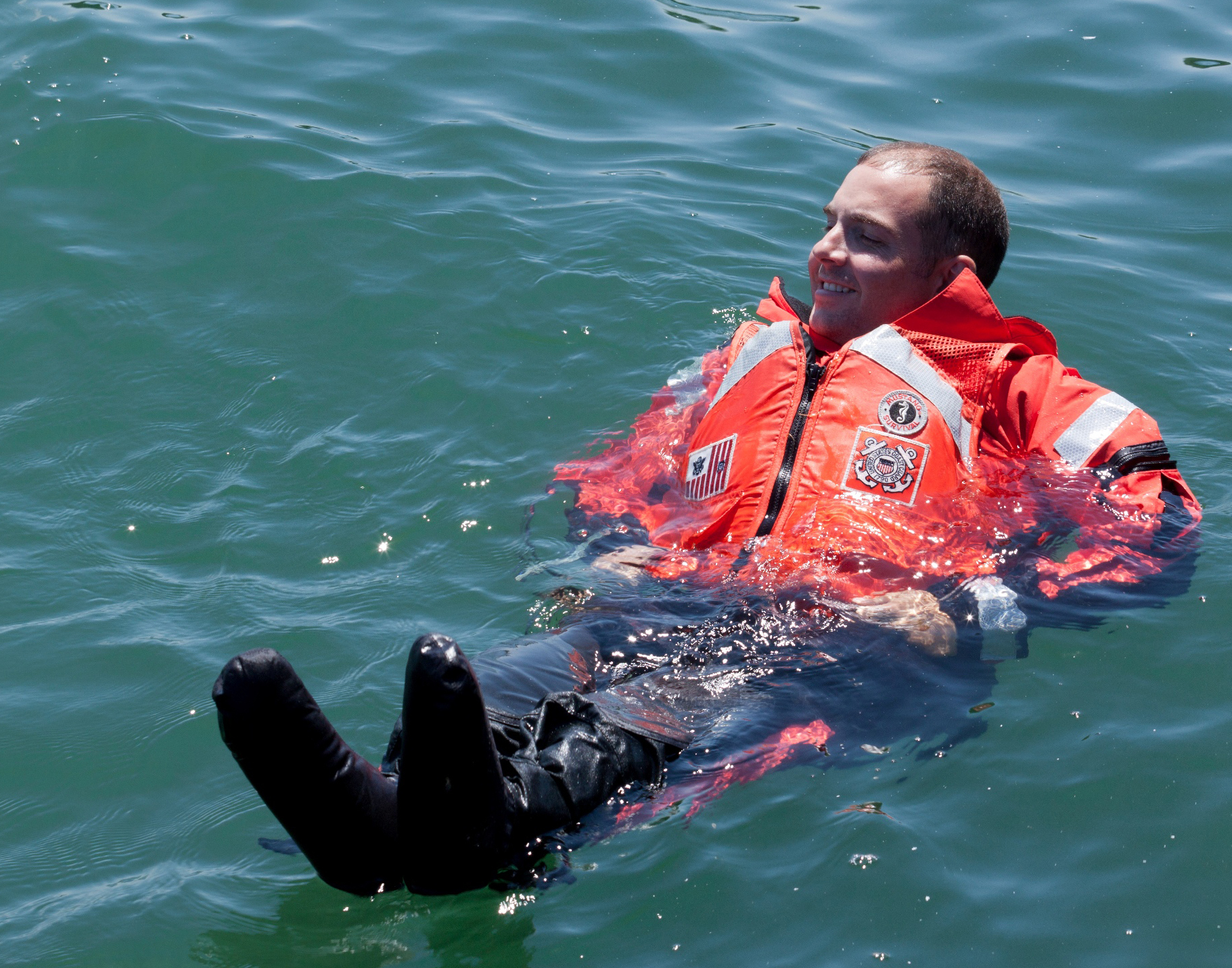
U.S. Coast Guard survival training

Most Safety of Life at Sea (SOLAS) equipment on board ships and small vessels are colored "international orange". International orange was officially adopted into the United States Coast Guard regulations for buoyant apparatus in 1962 in response to report recommendations after the 1961 Bluebelle incident and the rescue of Terry Jo Duperrault, an 11-year-old survivor who was adrift at sea for three days without food or water on a cramped raft that her rescuers noted was of a muted, neutral color that was difficult to notice in the water.

== See also ==
- Fire engine red
- List of colors
- Safety orange
- School bus yellow
