= Constellation Space Suit =

Planned full pressure space suit system

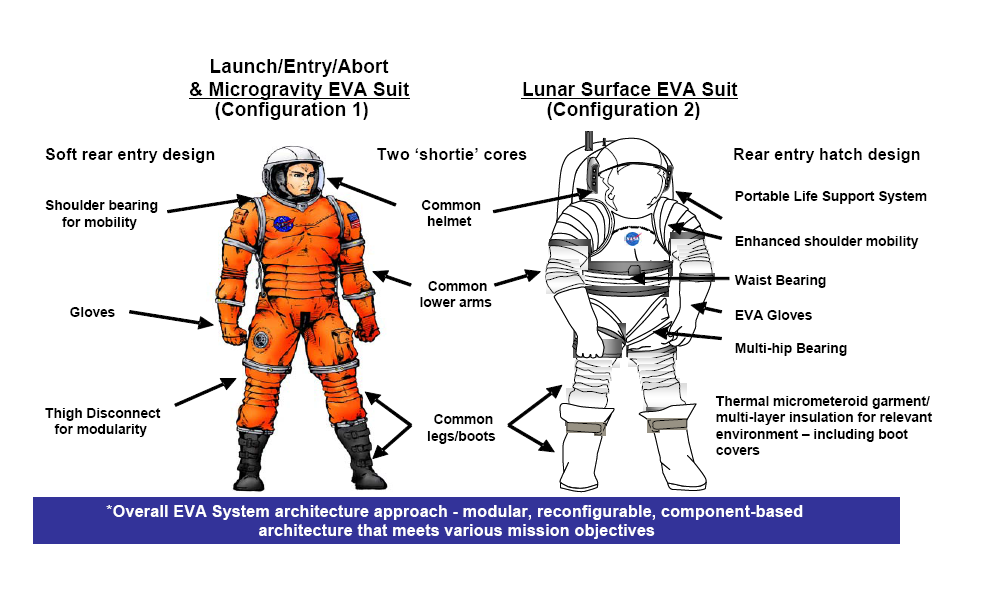
Project Constellation space suits. "Configuration One" suit at left, "Configuration Two" suit at right.

The Constellation Space Suit was a planned full pressure suit system that would have served as an intra-vehicular activity (IVA) and extra-vehicular activity (EVA) garment for the proposed Project Constellation flights. The design of the suit was announced by NASA on June 11, 2008, and it was to be manufactured by Houston, Texas-based Oceaneering International, the 4th company after the David Clark Company, Hamilton Sundstrand, and ILC Dover (and, before 1964, B.F. Goodrich) to produce life-support hardware, as a prime contractor, for in-flight space use. The Constellation Space Suit was ultimately never put into production following the cancellation of the Constellation Program with its successor, Artemis, using the xEMU and Orion Crew Survival System (OCSS) instead.

== Design ==
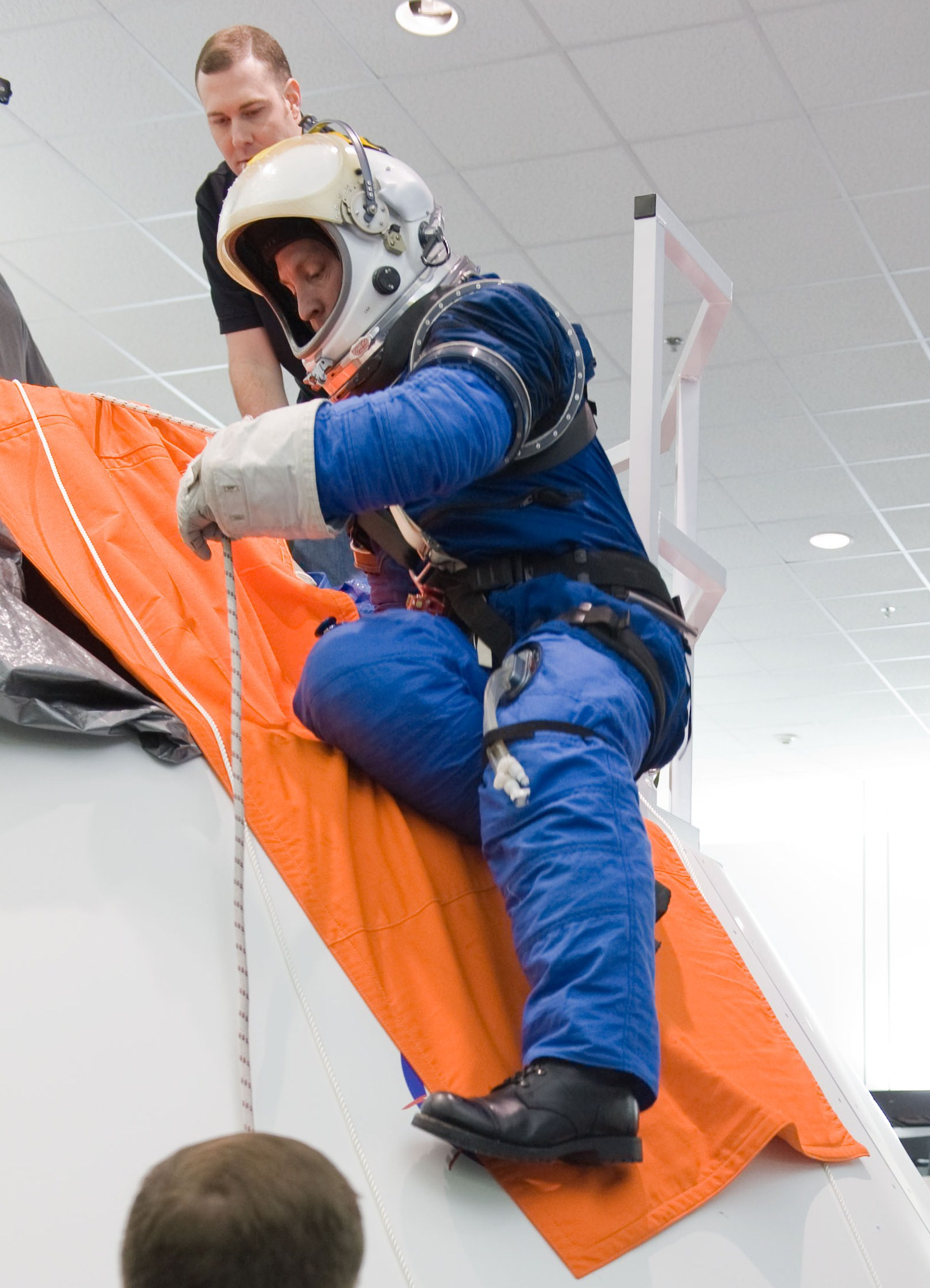
Image of early prototype - February 2010

The Constellation Space Suit system was designed by NASA for Constellation program due to the needs of reducing space on board the relatively small (by current standards) Orion spacecraft, and at the same time, would protect the astronauts during launch, reentry and landing, and extreme emergencies (such as a cabin depressurization). Another need for NASA was that the suit system must be capable of withstanding the rigors of microgravity EVAs, and with modifications, from the rigors of lunar surface EVAs during a 7-day lunar sortie, with the provisions for 6-month stays once the Lunar Outpost is completed.

As the Apollo/Skylab A7L, ACES, and Shuttle/ISS Extravehicular Mobility Unit (EMU) pressure and space suits were deemed unsuitable for NASA's needs for Project Constellation, a new suit system was designed and was designated as "Configuration One" (IVA/Microgravity EVA) and "Configuration Two" (Lunar EVA).

=== Configuration One ===
The "Configuration One" suit, worn for launch, landing, for extreme emergencies, and for microgravity EVAs, will resemble the current ACES pressure suit used by NASA astronauts on Space Shuttle flights. Unlike the current suit, which were based on the G3C suit worn by the Gemini 3 crew and later adapted for use by the U.S. Air Force for high-altitude operations, the "Configuration One" suit will feature a closed-loop environmental system (similar to that of a rebreather – the ACES suit uses a SCUBA-like open-loop system, limiting its operations above 100,000 feet or 30,000 metres), new bearings in the shoulder, elbows, wrists, hip, and knees, and a full-pressure helmet with a swivel faceplate (closed by a mechanical seal) and incorporating a sunshade. Like the older G3C suit, the "Configuration One" suit will be made up of five layers, the innermost being a rubberized pressure-retaining bladder made of neoprene cloth, and covered with a Nomex cover layer in international orange color.

In the event a microgravity EVA is conducted, instead of the Primary Life Support System backpack worn by Apollo, Space Shuttle, and ISS crews, astronauts will rely on a life-support umbilical used on all Gemini and Skylab flights. As the Orion spacecraft lacks an airlock like that found on the Shuttle and the ISS, all members of the spacecraft crew will be required to be suited up, as the entire cabin would be depressurized (similar to that employed on Gemini and Apollo), thus microgravity EVAs conducted from an Orion spacecraft would only be of an emergency nature.

The "Configuration One" system would be capable of supporting an astronaut crew for approximately 120 hours in the event of an emergency cabin depressurization.

- Manufacturer: Oceaneering International (David Clark Company as subcontractor)
- Missions: TBA, but ready to fly by 2015.
- Function: Intra-vehicular activity (IVA) and emergency Orbital Extra-vehicular activity (EVA)
- Operating Pressure: c. 8 psi (55 kPa)
- Primary Life Support: Vehicle Provided

=== Configuration Two ===
The "Configuration Two" suit, was to be used primarily for lunar EVAs conducted during the initial 7- to 10-day lunar sortie missions and later for 3 to 6-month lunar outpost missions, would consist of a completely new spacesuit, similar in appearance to both the Mark III and I-Suits designed and tested by ILC Dover in the early 2000s, but would incorporate the arms, legs, gloves, boot assemblies, and helmet from the "Configuration One" suit.

Like the Mark III and the Generation III I-Suit, the "Configuration Two" suit would use a rear-entry hatch design, eliminating the need for the dual-plane closure used on the Shuttle/ISS EMU suits and unlike the current NASA suit, a hybrid of both the Apollo A7L/A7LB suits and the Litton-developed RX-series hard suits, will be of a "soft-suit" design, allowing astronauts to bend over and grasp objects when fully suited and pressurized. New joint designs on the "Configuration Two" suits, along with the soft-suit elements from the "Configuration One" suits, will allow the suits to operate at a higher pressure (around 8 psi or 55 kPa, the pressurization used on the Orlan space suit), eliminating the danger of undergoing decompression sickness normally associated with the lower pressure of the Shuttle/ISS suits (which operates at 4.3 psi or 30 kPa).

Unlike the orange-colored "Configuration One" suits, the "Configuration Two" suits will have a white cover layer, which will require the use of cover layer "sleeves" on the arms and legs of the "Configuration One" suit. Like the cover layer on the A7L and A7LB suits, the cover layer "sleeves" for the "Configuration Two" suit's "Configuration One" limbs will be attached using Velcro.

- Manufacturer: Oceaneering International (David Clark Company as subcontractor)
- Function: Terrestrial Extra-vehicular activity (EVA)
- Operating Pressure: c. 8 psi (55 kPa)
- Primary Life Support: 150 hours

== Other items ==
Like the Shuttle/ISS EMU and the ACES pressure suit, astronauts would've worn, underneath of the suit, a "Depends"-like undergarment known as a Maximum Absorbency Garment or "MAG," which will allow for containment of urine and fecal matter (although the latter may be staved off with a low residue diet), over which a Liquid Cooling and Ventilation Garment (LCVG) is worn. The LCVG, resembling a union suit, has tubing sewn into the material to allow for the circulation of cooling water and removal of carbon dioxide while the suit is worn. A communication cap, known throughout NASA as a "Snoopy cap," is worn by the astronaut to facilitate communication through either the intercom system, or with Mission Control in Houston. Unlike the familiar white-striped brown caps currently in use, the "Snoopy caps" proposed for Constellation will be the white-colored caps worn by all Space Shuttle crews prior to STS-107 and with the two colors of the suit systems (orange and white), will make the American crews to somewhat resemble Soviet cosmonauts of the 1960s.

== Contractor ==
The Constellation Space Suit would be manufactured by Oceaneering International of Houston, Texas. The David Clark Company of Worcester, Massachusetts, the manufacturer of the ACES pressure suit (as well as the manufacturer of the Gemini space suit), and United Space Alliance, would be two of the seven subcontractors used by Oceaneering to develop and manufacture the suit.
