= David Clark Company =

American manufacturing company

David Clark Company, Inc.
- Type: Private corporation
- Industry: Electronics and textiles manufacturing
- Founded: 1935; 91 years ago
- Founder: David M. Clark
- Headquarters: Worcester, Massachusetts, U.S.
- Key people: Richard M. Urella (president)
- Products: Communication headsets, protective clothing and equipment
- Operating income: $20 to $50 million (est.)
- Number of employees: 300 (est., D&B)
- Subsidiaries: Air-Lock, Inc.
- Website: www.davidclarkcompany.com

David Clark Company, Inc. (DCC) is an American manufacturing company. DCC designs and manufactures a wide variety of aerospace and industrial protective equipment, including pressure-space suit systems, anti-G suits, headsets, and several medical/safety products. DCC has been involved in the design and manufacture of air-space crew protective equipment since 1941, beginning with the design and development of the first standard anti-G suits and valves used by allied fighter pilots during World War II.

== Facilities ==
Located in Worcester, Massachusetts, the company was founded in 1935 by David M. Clark. It started in the textile business with the development of unique knitted materials for specialty undergarments and over time evolved to making aerospace and communications related products. The David Clark Company is housed in a four-story building containing approximately 215,000 square feet (20,000 m^{2}) of working area.

== Signature products ==
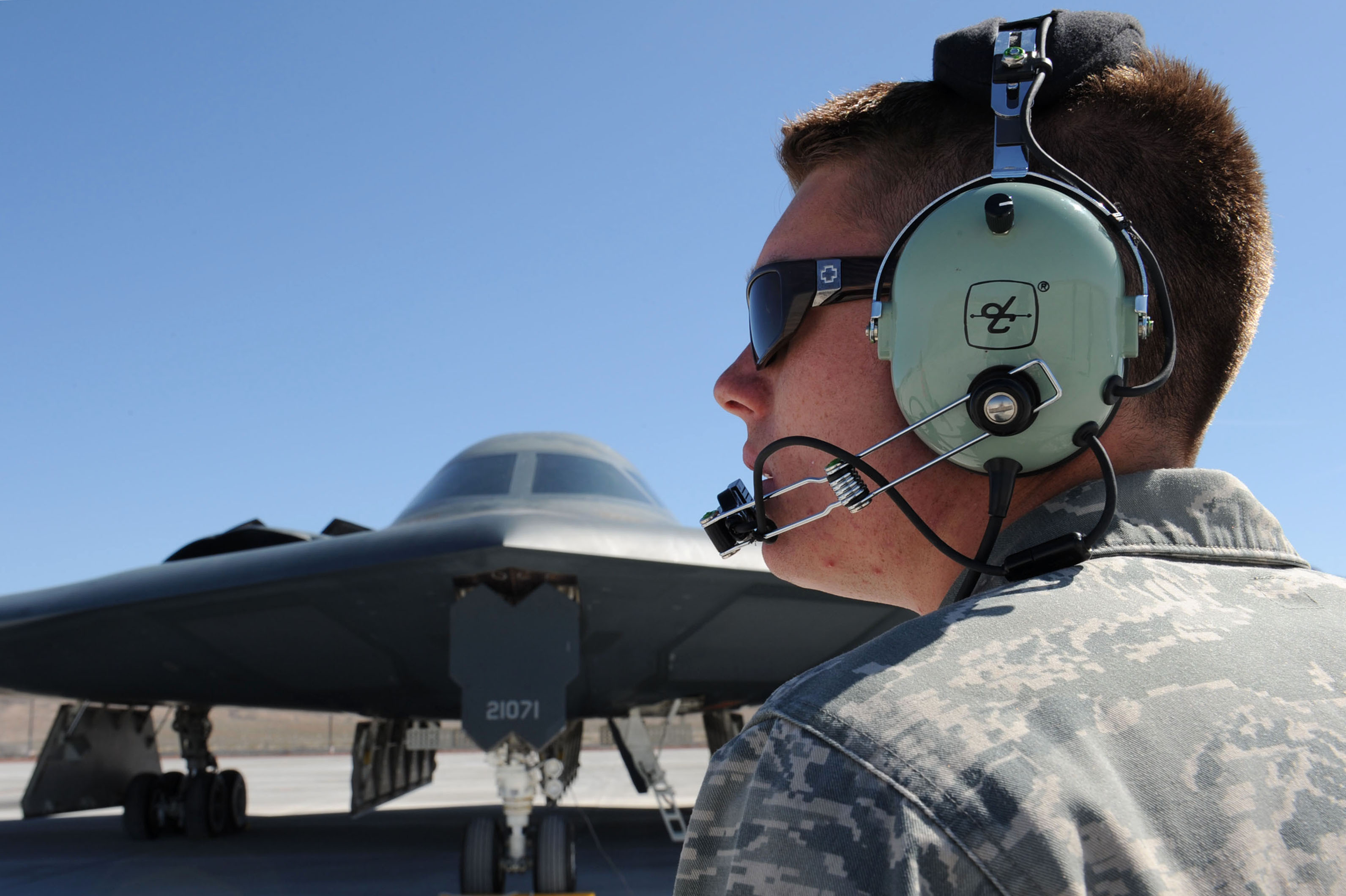
Aviation headset

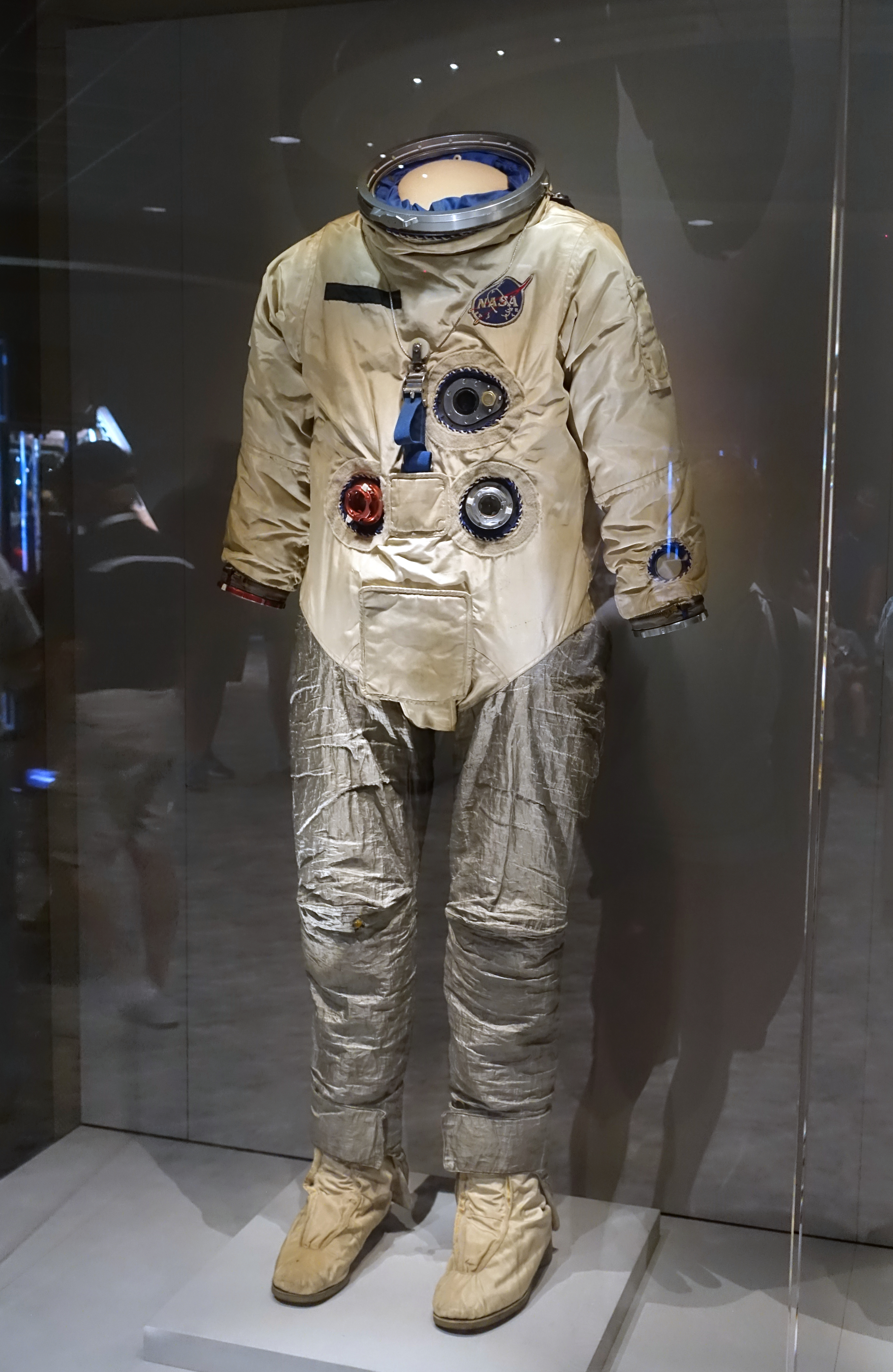
David Clark Company has contributed to the development of pressure suits since 1941.

=== Headsets ===
The company is best known for noise attenuating communication headset systems featuring boom microphones.

=== G-suits ===
David Clark worked closely with the laboratory of Earl Wood at the Mayo Clinic when developing the early G-suit. The goal was to prevent blackout during high-G forces experienced during dive bombing maneuvers. With the physiologic principles of blackout during high G-forces worked out by Wood and colleagues, the G-activated single pressure suit utilizing air bladders, first released in 1943 with improvements to follow in 1944, provided what was considered to be a significant advantage for the Allied forces. Of key importance was Wood and colleagues' recognition that gravitationally induced loss of consciousness (GLOC) was due to relative loss of arterial pressure pushing blood to the head rather than a loss of venous return.

=== Pressure suits ===
The company has designed and manufactured pressure/space suits and life support systems for NASA and U.S. Air Force. It developed partial pressure suits for NASA's Bell X-1 rocket-powered research aircraft in the 1940s, and full pressure suits for the D558-2 and North American X-15 research aircraft in the 1950s. DCC's X-15 suit design became the basis for all of its subsequent full pressure suits, including the spacesuits worn by astronauts for the first U.S. extravehicular activities (EVA) conducted during NASA's Project Gemini. It also participated in team effort to develop the Integrated Life Support System for F-15 jet fighter and B-1 bomber crews.Since 1946, DCC's continuous pressure suit research and development efforts, sponsored largely by the Department of Defense to support its USAF high-altitude aircraft (Lockheed U-2 and SR-71) programs, resulted in the late 1980s development of a new-generation pressure suit. The result was the S1034 Pilot's Protective Assembly (PPA). The S1034 PPA has since become the USAF and DoD standard pressure suit and served as the basis for NASA's S1035 Advanced Crew Escape Suit (ACES). This was adopted for the Space Shuttle program, replacing DCC's (partial pressure) S1032 Launch Entry Suit (LES). Both the S1034 PPA and S1035 ACES continue to be used by the USAF and NASA. Throughout the 1990s, DCC conducted engineering design and development activities for the USAF Advanced Technology Anti-G Suit (ATAGS) program. This included the design and analysis of advanced ATAGS/Combat Edge vest designs for the F-22 Raptor.

DCC designed and developed the Tactical Flyer's Ensemble (United States Patent 7,076,808). Research has also been conducted to develop the next generation of advanced pressure/spacesuit systems that will be required to satisfy emerging crewed space exploration requirements. This included the development of the S1035-X ("D-suit") in the late 1990s and the follow-on Enhanced Mobility ACES circa 2005. In 2008, DCC, along with its subsidiary, Air-Lock, Inc. of Milford, Connecticut, partnered with Houston, Texas-based Oceaneering Space Systems to develop the Constellation Space Suit System (CSSS) for use on the then-upcoming Constellation program. In 2010, they designed, developed, and fabricated pressure suits utilized on the Red Bull Stratos project, with which Felix Baumgartner performed a record-breaking free fall from a high-altitude balloon on 14 October 2012.

In 2026, the S1041 also known as the NASA Orion Crew Survival System (OCSS) suit was flown as the secondary pressure safety system around the Moon with Artemis II.
