= Advanced Crew Escape Suit =

United States spacesuit

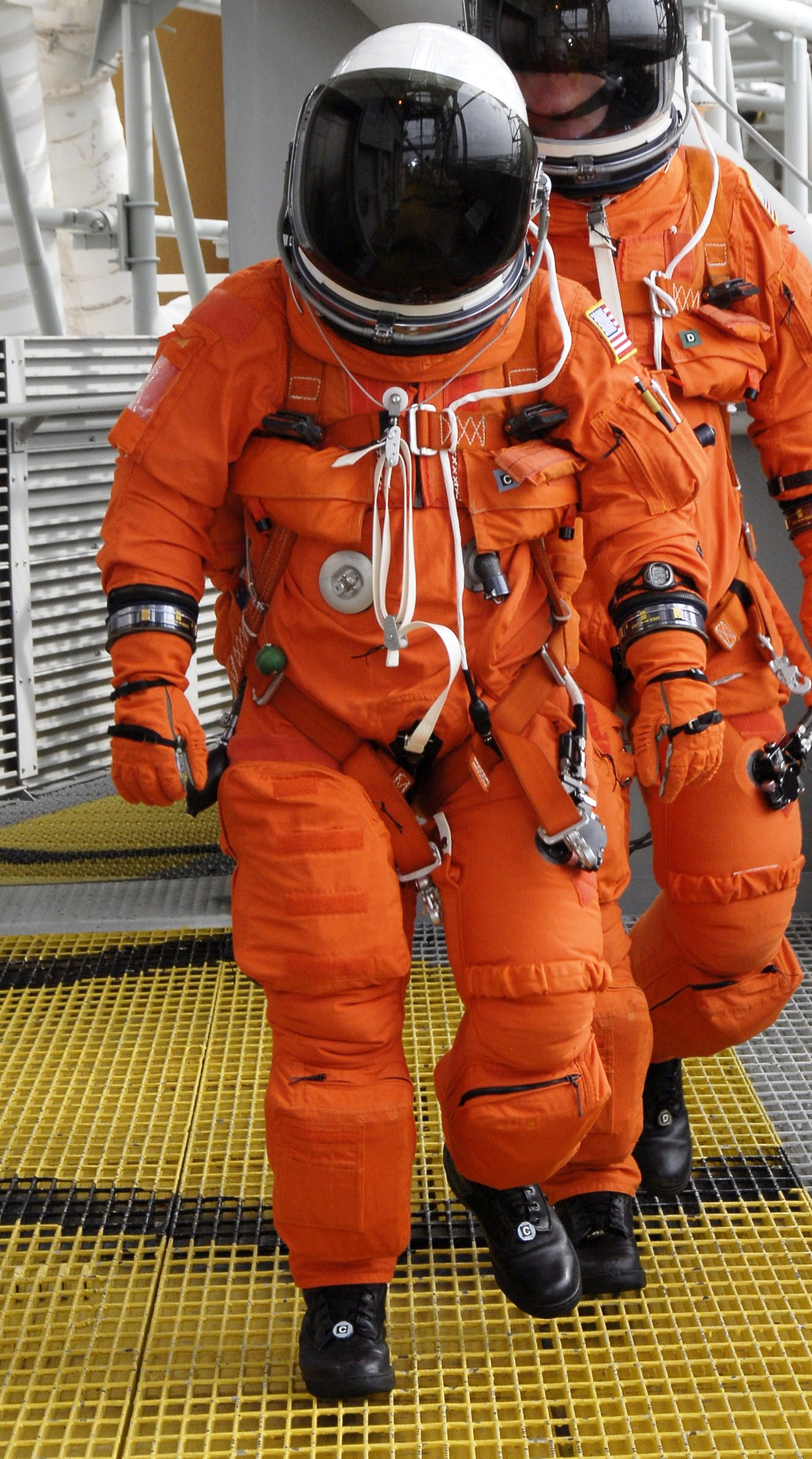
- An astronaut wearing the ACES suit prior to the launch of STS-130
- Type: Full pressure IVA suit
- Manufacturer: David Clark Company
- Operating pressure: 3.5 psi (24 kPa)
- Mass: 92 lb (42 kg)
- Life support: 10 minutes
- Derived from: USAF Model S1034
- Derivatives: Constellation Space Suit; Orion Crew Survival System
- Used for: Space Shuttle

The Advanced Crew Escape Suit (ACES), or "pumpkin suit", is a full pressure suit that Space Shuttle crews began wearing after STS-64, for the ascent and entry portions of flight. The suit is a direct descendant of the U.S. Air Force high-altitude pressure suits worn by the two-man crews of the SR-71 Blackbird, pilots of the U-2 and X-15, and Gemini pilot-astronauts, and the Launch Entry Suits (LES) worn by NASA astronauts starting on the STS-26 flight, the first flight after the Challenger disaster. The suit is manufactured by the David Clark Company of Worcester, Massachusetts. Cosmetically the suit is very similar to the LES. ACES was first used in 1994 on STS-64.

== History ==
In 1990, the LES was nearing the end of its service life, so a program to produce a successor was initiated. Favorable crew evaluations of a prototype led to full scale development and qualification that would run until 1992. Production of the completed design began in February 1993, and the first suit was delivered to NASA in May 1994.

After 1998, it became the only suit used during launch and re-entry on the Space Shuttle. The ACES incorporates gloves on disconnecting lock rings on the wrists, liquid cooling and improved ventilation, and an extra layer of insulation. The ACES suit is analogous to the Sokol suits used for Soyuz missions and its functions are virtually the same – the primary differences being the ACES suit having a detachable helmet and survival backpack, while the Russian suit has an integrated helmet and no backpack (due to the limitations in space aboard the Soyuz, and that the spacecraft is an entry capsule, not a winged spacecraft or lifting body).

== Design ==
- A one-piece pressure garment assembly with integrated pressure bladders and ventilation system. Oxygen is fed through a connector at the wearer's left thigh and is transmitted to the helmet, via a special connector at the base of the neckring. The helmet and gloves are connected to the suit, via locking rings, a metallic gray in color (Gemini suits featured a gray neck ring and red and blue anodized glove rings). The suit has a Nomex cover layer in international orange color, instead of silver or white as in previous David Clark suits. The orange color allows rescue units to easily spot the astronauts in the case of an Orbiter bailout over the ocean. Underneath the suits, astronauts wear Maximum Absorbency Garments (MAGs) urine-containment trunks (resembling incontinence shorts) and blue-colored thermal underwear, which has plastic tubing woven into the garments allowing for liquid cooling and ventilation, the latter being handled by a connector located on the astronaut's left waist. The pressure bladder uses a "breathable" material that, while maintaining pressure, allows perspiration to exit and prevents liquids from entering, this is an improvement over the non-breathable pressure bladder used for the LES.
- A full pressure helmet with a locking clear visor and a black sunshade worn to reduce any glare from reflected sunlight, especially during the approach and landing phases of the mission. This is the same model used with the LES. It was chosen for its wide field of view, comfort and lack of headborne weight. A communications cap (originally white, but since changed to dark brown and identical to those worn by the Russian cosmonauts with the Sokol space suits worn aboard Soyuz missions), is worn underneath the helmet, and connected to a special plug inside the helmet, which is then connected to the intercom system in the Orbiter, via a white-colored plug similar in appearance to the communications "pigtail" on the old Mercury helmets. An anti-suffocation valve at the back of the helmet allows for the passing of carbon dioxide from the helmet. The helmet's clear pressure faceplate is locked into place using a mechanical seal with a prominent "lockdown" bar that can be easily reached with gloved hands.
- The gloves are also attached via a locking ring and are likewise in international orange color. These can be put on more easily and more quickly than was possible with the launch entry suit, and ball bearings allow the wrist to "swivel". When the suit is pressurized, the gloves are also pressurized. The palm of the gloves is textured to allow crews to throw switches, push buttons, turn knobs (especially the "ABORT MODE" knob on the commander's panel), and, for the commander and pilot, to operate the flight control stick during the final approach during landing.
- Heavy black leather "paratrooper" boots with zippers instead of laces. These help prevent foot and ankle injuries and reduce swelling of the feet when the suit is pressurized. No cloth is used on the boot, as a way to prevent injuries in the event of a flash fire.
- Survival backpack, which includes a personal life raft.
- Light sticks, which are tucked into the shoulder pockets on both upper arms. The light sticks are intended as an aid in case of an emergency, and are colored orange to identify the astronaut crew, while technicians in the close-out crew carry green ones.

Each suit is sized individually, although most suits can be worn by astronauts of different heights. No ACES has failed during normal flight operations. The Columbia investigation found that the crews' ACES all failed at some point, but also that none of the Columbia crew had sealed their helmets, and also that several were not wearing suit gloves. By comparison, in 1966 an SR-71 pilot in a similar suit, whose helmet and gloves were sealed, survived similar pressure conditions when his aircraft broke up while flying at approximately Mach 3. The "thermal and chemical environment of the Columbia accident" (the temperature and oxygen concentration) was "much more severe" than in the SR-71 accident, however, and the report recommended that future crew survival suits be evaluated for thermal and chemical resistance as well as (as USAF suits had been evaluated previously) pressure and windblast.

=== Specifications ===
- Name: Advanced Crew Escape Suit (S1035)
- Derived from: USAF Model S1034
- Manufacturer: David Clark Company
- Missions: STS-64 to STS-135
- Function: Intra-vehicular activity (IVA)
- Pressure type: Full
- Operating pressure: 3.5 psi (24 kPa)
- Total weight: 92 lb (42 kg)
  - Suit weight: 28 lb (13 kg)
  - Parachute and survival systems weight: 64 lb (29 kg)
- Useful altitude: 98,000 ft (30 km)
- Primary life support: Externally to suit, vehicle provided
- Backup life support: 10 minutes

== Future use ==
Initially, ACES was intended to be retired after the Space Shuttle program and be replaced by the Constellation Space Suit for Orion missions. The Artemis program instead planned to use a modified ACES called the Orion Crew Survival System (OCSS). This suit will have increased mobility in comparison to its Space Shuttle counterpart and will use a closed-loop system to preserve resources. The OCSS is to be worn inside the Orion spacecraft during launch and re-entry, in case of a depressurization emergency.

== Gallery ==
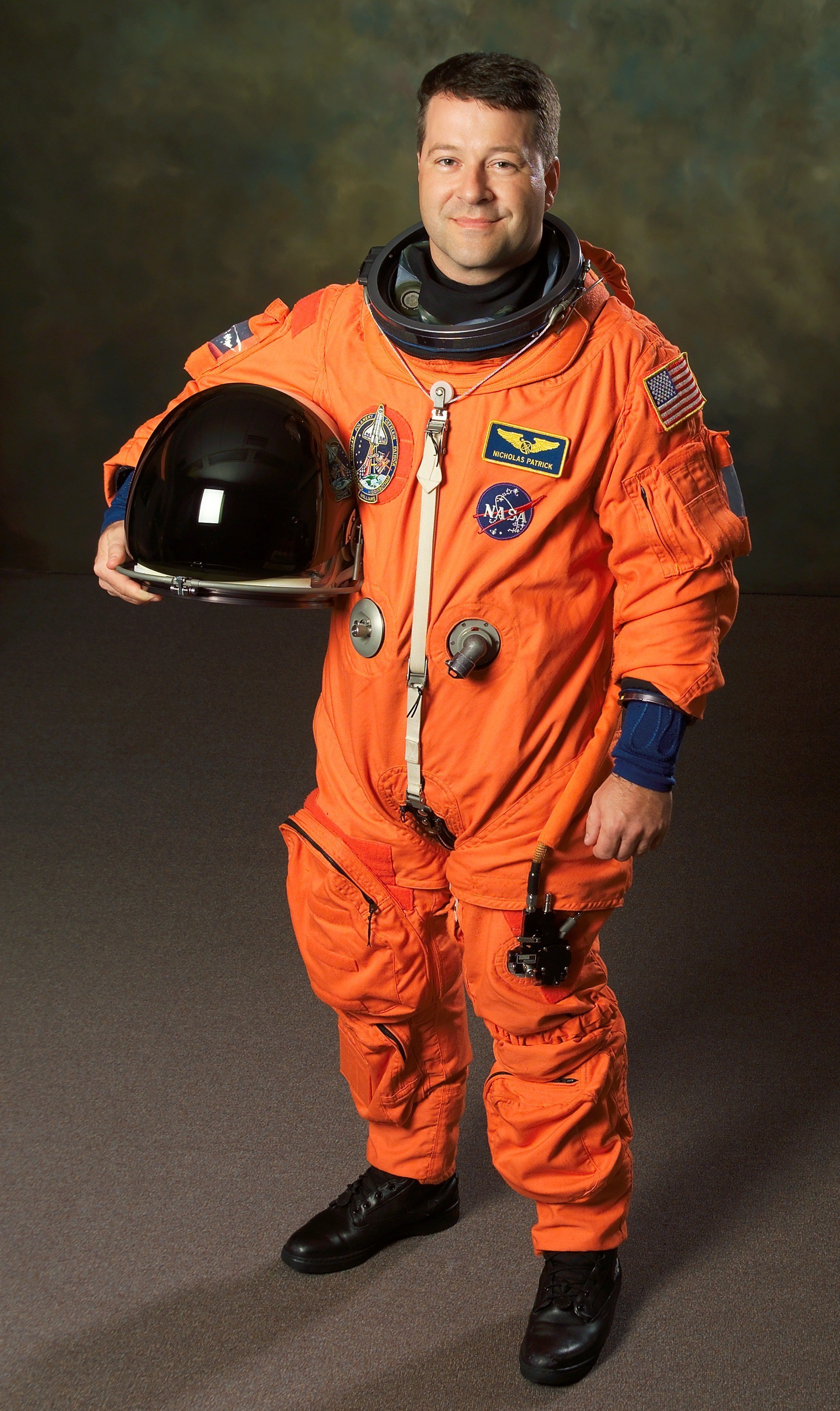
ACES without parachute and survival equipment (Worn by Nicholas Patrick)

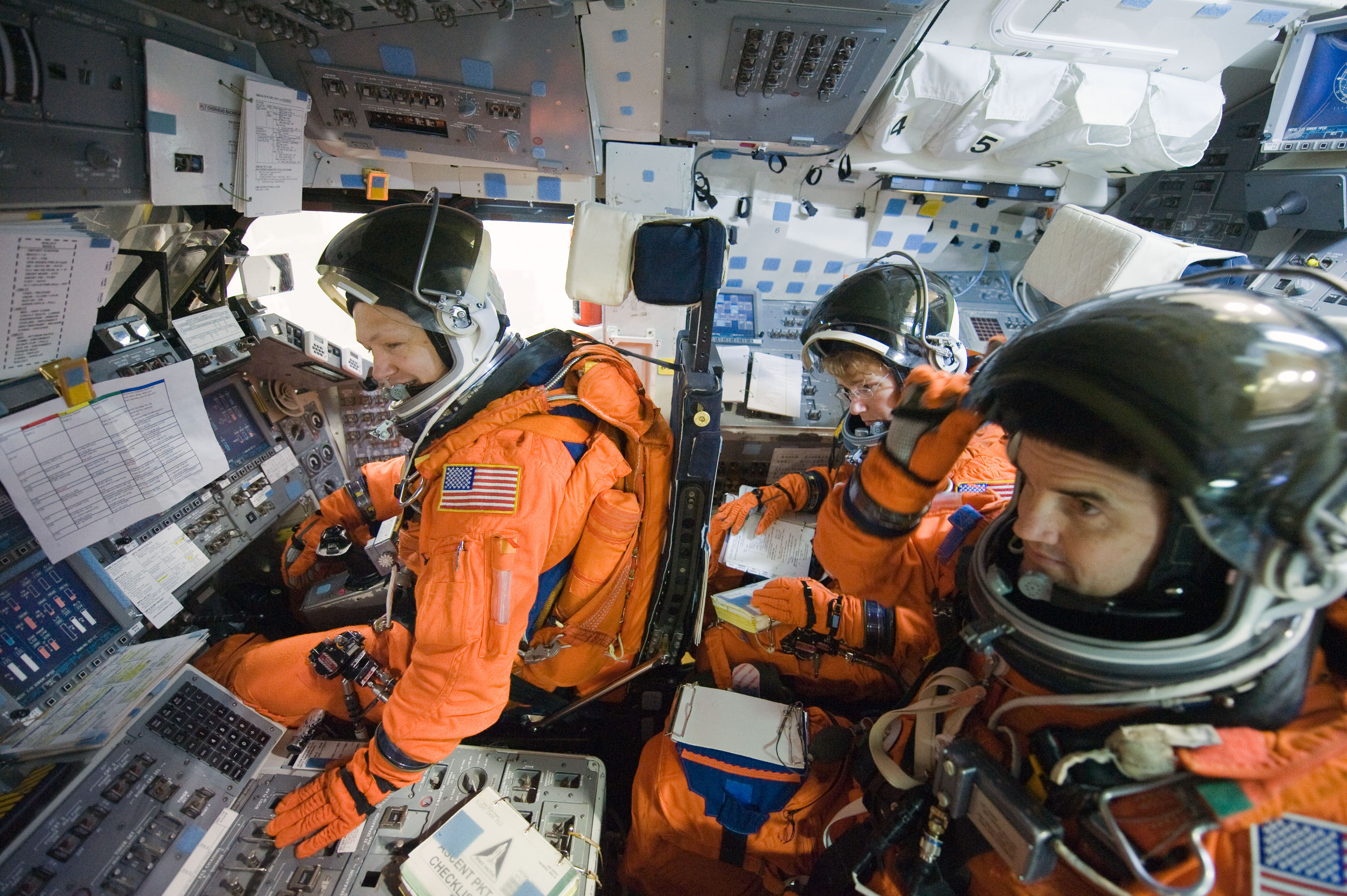
Crew of STS-135 inside Space Shuttle mock-up during training (Pictured (L to R): Doug Hurley, Sandra Magnus, and Rex Walheim)

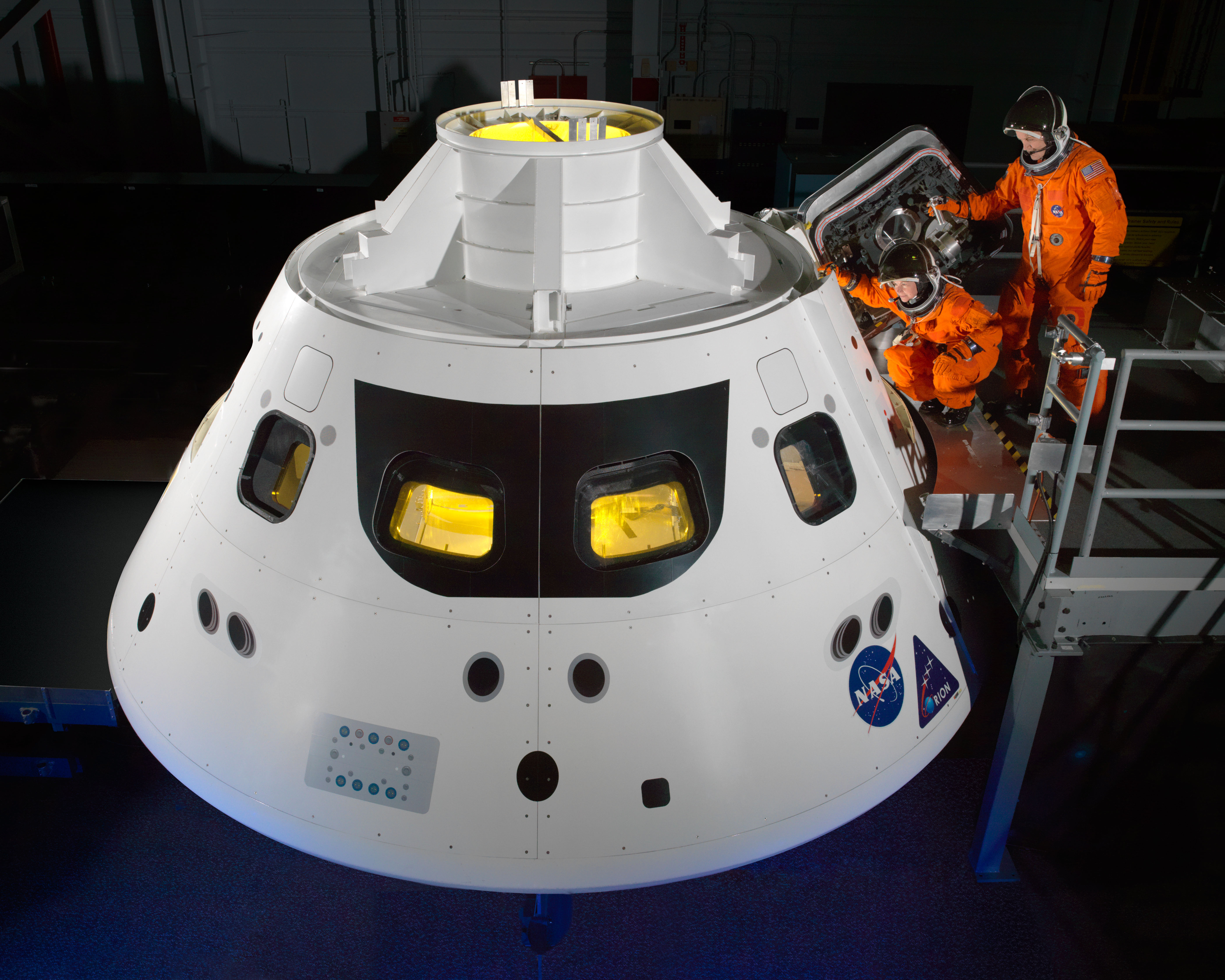
ACES being used by crew during Orion mock-up trials (Pictured (L to R): Cady Coleman and Ricky Arnold)

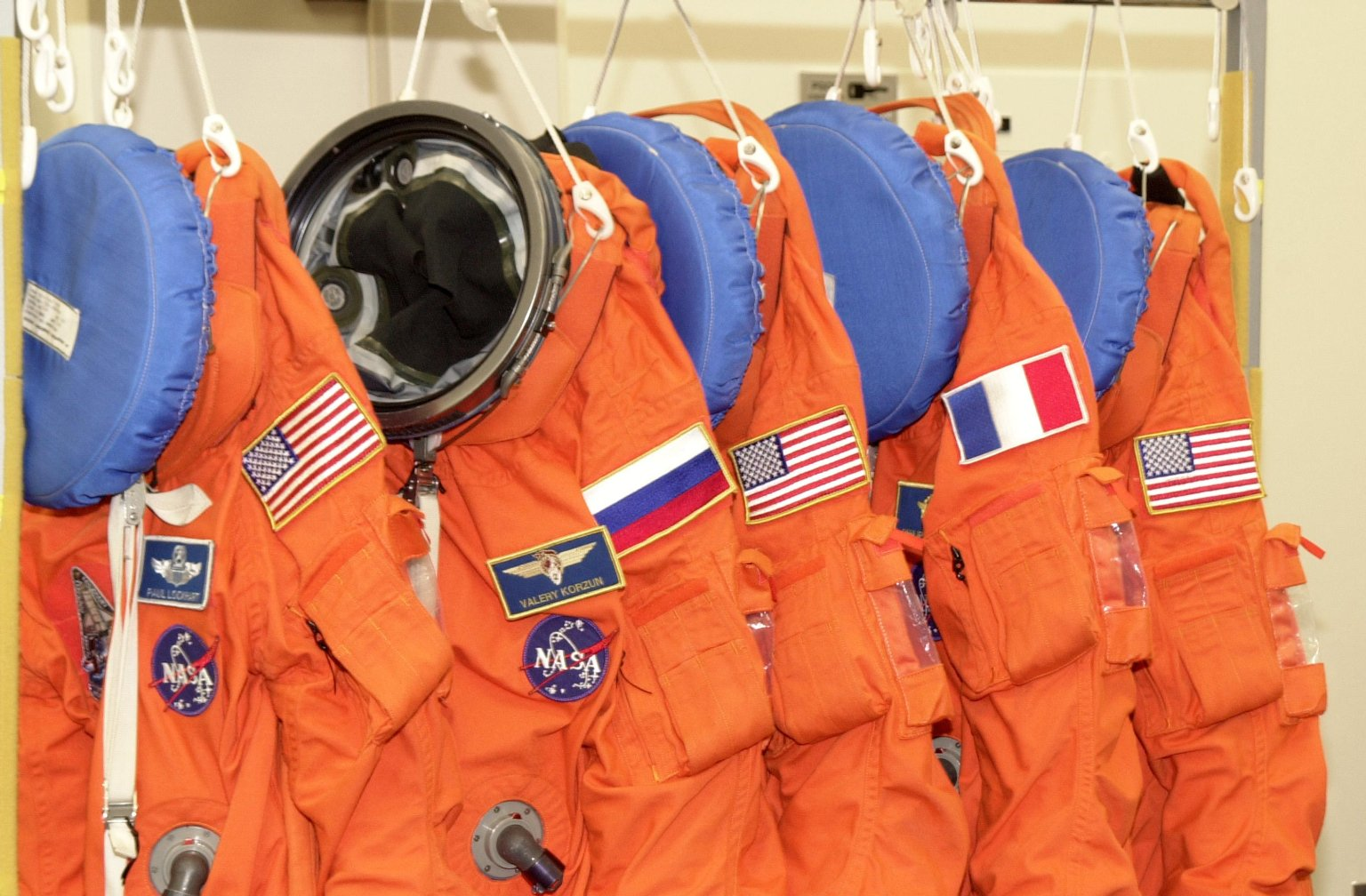
ACES suits on coat hanger, NASA
