= Oceaneering International =

Subsea engineering and applied technology company

Oceaneering International, Inc.
- Type: Public
- Traded as: NYSE: OII; S&P 600 component
- Industry: Oil and gas equipment, services
- Founded: 1964; 62 years ago
- Headquarters: Houston, Texas, U.S.
- Key people: M. Kevin McEvoy, Chairman of the Board; Rod Larson, Director & CEO; Alan R. Curtis, Sr. Vice President & CFO
- Products: ROV services; Subsea oilfield hardware; Deepwater intervention; Crewed diving services; Nondestructive testing; Engineering/project management; Survey and mapping services; Mobile Robotics, and Entertainment systems; Aerospace thermal protection
- Revenue: ▲US$ 2.8 billion (2025)
- Operating income: ▲US$ $305 million (2025)
- Net income: ▲US$ $354 million (2025)
- Total assets: ▲US$ 2.54 billion (2025)
- Total equity: ▲US$ 913.7 million (2025)
- Number of employees: ~12,000 (2025)
- Website: www.oceaneering.com

Oceaneering International, Inc. is a subsea engineering and applied technology company based in Houston, Texas, U.S. that provides engineered services and hardware to customers who operate in marine, space, and other environments.

Oceaneering's business offerings include remotely operated vehicle (ROV) services, specialty oilfield subsea hardware, deepwater intervention and crewed diving services, non-destructive testing and inspections, engineering and project management, and surveying and mapping services. Its services and products are marketed worldwide to oil and gas companies, government agencies, and firms in the aerospace, marine engineering and mobile robotics and construction industries.

== History ==
Oceaneering was founded in 1964 with the incorporation of World Wide Divers, Inc., one of three companies who merged in 1969 to operate under the name Oceaneering International, Inc. The merged companies were World Wide Divers, Inc. (Morgan City, LA), California Divers, Inc. (Santa Barbara, CA), and Can-Dive Services Ltd (North Vancouver, BC).

World Wide Divers, Inc. was owned by Mike Hughes and Johnny Johnson. California Divers, Inc. was owned by Lad Handelman, Gene Handelman, Kevin Lengyel, and Bob Ratcliffe. Can-Dive Services Ltd was owned by Phil Nuytten and partners. Mike Hughes served as Chairman of the Board and Lad Handelman served as President of the merged companies.

=== Research and Diving Technology ===
In the early 1970s, Oceaneering supported considerable research into ways to increase safety of their divers and general diving efficiency, including their collaboration with Duke University Medical Center to explore the use of trimix breathing gas to reduce the incidence of high-pressure nervous syndrome.

Oceaneering purchased the rights to the JIM suit in 1975. By 1979, a team from Oceaneering assisted Dr. Sylvia Earle in testing Atmospheric diving suits for scientific diving operations by diving a JIM suit to 1,250 fsw. Oceaneering also used WASP atmospheric diving suits.

=== Salvage and Recovery Operations ===
A dive team from Oceaneering salvaged three of the four propellers from the RMS Lusitania in 1982.

Oceaneering ROVs were used to determine what happened to the cargo ship Lucona in the 1991 murder and fraud investigation that claimed uranium mining equipment was lost when the vessel went down.

Recovery of the airplane cockpit voice recorder in the loss of ValuJet Flight 592 was a priority in early 1996. In the days following the loss of TWA Flight 800 later that same year, Oceaneering was contacted to provide ROV support to the US Navy lead search and recovery effort.

Oceaneering helped recover the Confederate submarine H. L. Hunley, which sank in 1864. Several recovery plans were evaluated; the final recovery included a truss structure with foam to surround the body of the submarine. On August 8, 2000, at 8:37 a.m., the sub broke the surface for the first time in 136 years.

=== Robotics, Space, and Special Projects ===
From 1984 to 1988, Michael L. Gernhardt served as Oceaneering's Manager and then Vice President of Special Projects. He led the development of a telerobotic system for subsea platform cleaning and inspection, and of a variety of new diver and robot tools. In 1988, he founded Oceaneering Space Systems, to transfer subsea technology and operational experience to the ISS program.

After the 1986 Space Shuttle Challenger disaster, Oceaneering teams recovered the Solid Rocket Booster that contained the faulty O-ring responsible for launch's failure.

On August 2, 2006, NASA announced it would issue a Request for Proposal (RFP) for the design, development, certification, production and sustaining engineering of the Constellation Space Suit to meet the needs of the Constellation Program. On June 11, 2008, NASA awarded a USD$745 million contract to Oceaneering for the creation and manufacture of this new space suit.

=== Defense and Naval Engineering ===
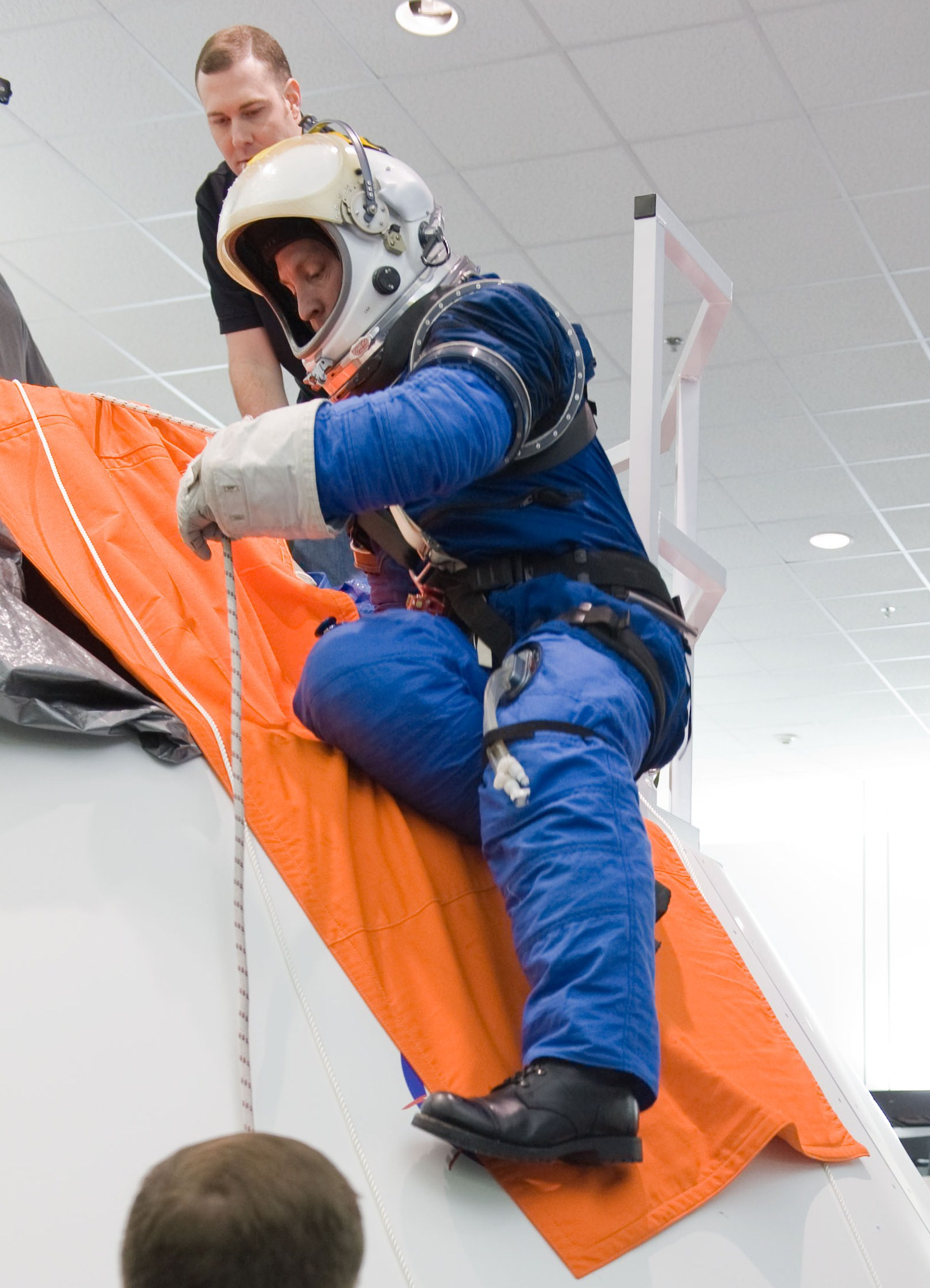
Image of early Constellation Space Suit prototype – February 2010

In 2006, NAVSEA awarded Oceaneering a maintenance contract for the Dry Deck Shelter program. Dry Deck Shelters are used to transport equipment such as the Advanced SEAL Delivery System and Combat Rubber Raiding Craft aboard a submarine.

In 2009, Oceaneering installed a demonstrator crane aboard the SS Flickertail State to evaluate its performance in transferring containers between two moving ships, in an operational environment using commercial and oil industry at-sea mooring techniques in the Gulf of Mexico. Developed in conjunction with the Sea Warfare and Weapons Department in the Office of Naval Research, the crane has sensors and cameras as well as motion-sensing algorithms that automatically compensate for the rolling and pitching of the sea, making it much easier for operators to center it over and transfer cargo.

=== Industry Collaborations and Technology Licensing ===
Oceaneering teamed up with the Canadian company GRI Simulations to design and produce the ROV simulators they utilize for training, development of procedures, and equipment staging. After a dispute over theft of trade secrets and copyright infringement that lasted several years, Oceaneering now licenses the VROV simulator system from GRI Simulations.

A 2009 collaboration with Royal Dutch Shell saw the installation of a wireline at a record 2,673 feet (815 m) of water for repairing a safety valve.

Boeing and Fugro teamed up with Oceaneering in 2001 to begin integration of their advanced technology into deep sea exploration.

=== Major Projects and Deepwater Operations ===
On April 22, 2010, three Oceaneering ROV crews aboard the Oceaneering vessel Ocean Intervention III, the DOF ASA Skandi Neptune and the Boa International Boa Sub C began to map the seabed and assess the wreckage from the Deepwater Horizon oil spill. The crews reported "large amounts of oil that flowed out." Oceaneering ROV Technician Tyrone Benton was later called as a witness to provide information on the leaks associated with BOP stack investigation, but gave no reason why he later failed to appear in court.

Petrobras, the biggest deepwater oilfield company in the world, placed the largest umbilical order in company history in 2012.

As of 2012, eighty percent of Oceaneering's income has been derived from deepwater work. It is also the world's largest operator of ROVs.

BAE Systems was contracted in October 2013 to build a Jones Act-compliant multi-service vessel to serve Oceaneering's "subsea intervention services in the ultra-deep waters of the Gulf of Mexico", which was delivered in 2019.

In 2024, Oceaneering acquired Global Design Innovation Ltd., a UK-based provider of digital and software solutions.

Oceaneering’s Brazilian subsidiary secured multiple four-year subsea robotics contracts worth about $180 million from Petrobras in 2025 to provide ROV services, tooling, and surveys for offshore projects in Brazil.

The company launched the Momentum electric work-class ROV in March 2026. It is an electrically propelled remotely operated vehicle designed for extended subsea operations.

Oceaneering was a NASDAQ listed company until 1991, when they moved to the New York Stock Exchange.

== Global Operations ==
Oceaneering International, Inc. operates in 24 countries with more than 70 operational bases and approximately 12,000 employees worldwide. The company has significant operations in Africa, the United Kingdom, Norway, Brazil, Asia, and Australia, and its global headquarters is located in Houston, Texas. Regional offices are maintained in major hubs such as Aberdeen (United Kingdom), Abu Dhabi (United Arab Emirates), Baku (Azerbaijan), Chandigarh (India), Luanda (Angola), Perth (Australia), Rio de Janeiro (Brazil), Selangor (Malaysia), Stavanger (Norway), and Newfoundland (Canada).

=== Remote Operations ===
The company operates Onshore Remote Operations Centers (OROCs) in Stavanger (Norway), Morgan City (United States), Aberdeen (United Kingdom), and Macaé (Brazil). These facilities support remote piloting of subsea vehicles and provide services such as underwater inspections, rig positioning, and asset monitoring.

== Oceaneering Entertainment Systems ==
The Oceaneering Entertainment Systems (OES) was a division of Oceaneering International that developed educational and entertainment technology, such as the Shuttle Launch Experience at the Kennedy Space Center Visitor Complex in Florida. It was based in Orlando, Florida, with an additional site in Hanover, Maryland.

OES was formed in 1992 following Oceaneering International’s acquisition of Eastport International, Inc., a company specializing in underwater remotely operated vehicles (ROVs). Eastport had recently been contracted by Universal Studios Florida to redesign and build the animatronic sharks for its Jaws attraction. The original animatronics, ride system and control system had malfunctioned, causing the attraction to close soon after its grand opening. After the acquisition, themed attraction work was moved to the new OES division, which completed the Jaws contract.

Over the years, OES developed motion-based dark ride vehicles for attractions such as Transformers: The Ride at Universal Studios Florida, Justice League: Battle for Metropolis at Six Flags parks, Antarctica: Empire of the Penguin at SeaWorld, and Speed of Magic at Ferrari World Abu Dhabi, among others. It has also produced animatronics for Universal Studios' Jurassic Park and Jaws rides and provided custom show-action equipment for various entertainment projects, including Revenge of the Mummy at Universal Studios Orlando, and Curse of DarKastle at Busch Gardens Williamsburg.

OES received several Themed Entertainment Association (THEA) Awards, including the award for the Revolution Tru-Trackless ride system in 2014, for Transformers: The Ride 3-D at Universal Studios Hollywood and Singapore in 2013, and for Shuttle Launch Experience in 2008.

In May 2025, Oceaneering Entertainment Systems was acquired by Falcon's Beyond.

== Community outreach ==
Oceaneering donated a hyperbaric chamber to assist with the treatment on the Miskito Indian population in 1986. They donated a compressor in 1997 that, along with funding from the Divers Alert Network, supported continued medical support of the Miskito population.

In November 2009, Oceaneering donated an ROV to Stavanger Offshore Tekniske Skole, a Norwegian technical college, to facilitate their students' qualification exams. They donated an ROV to South Central Louisiana Technical College in 2011 to support its unique ROV maintenance curriculum.

In 2021, Oceaneering donated three deep-sea exploration systems, including the Magellan 725 ROV, Ocean Discovery ROV, and Ocean Explorer 6000 towed sonar, along with related deployment equipment to the nonprofit Global Oceans to support ocean science research.

== See also ==
- List of oilfield service companies
- Category: Amusement rides manufactured by Oceaneering International
