= Launch Entry Suit =

Spacesuit worn by Space Shuttle crews

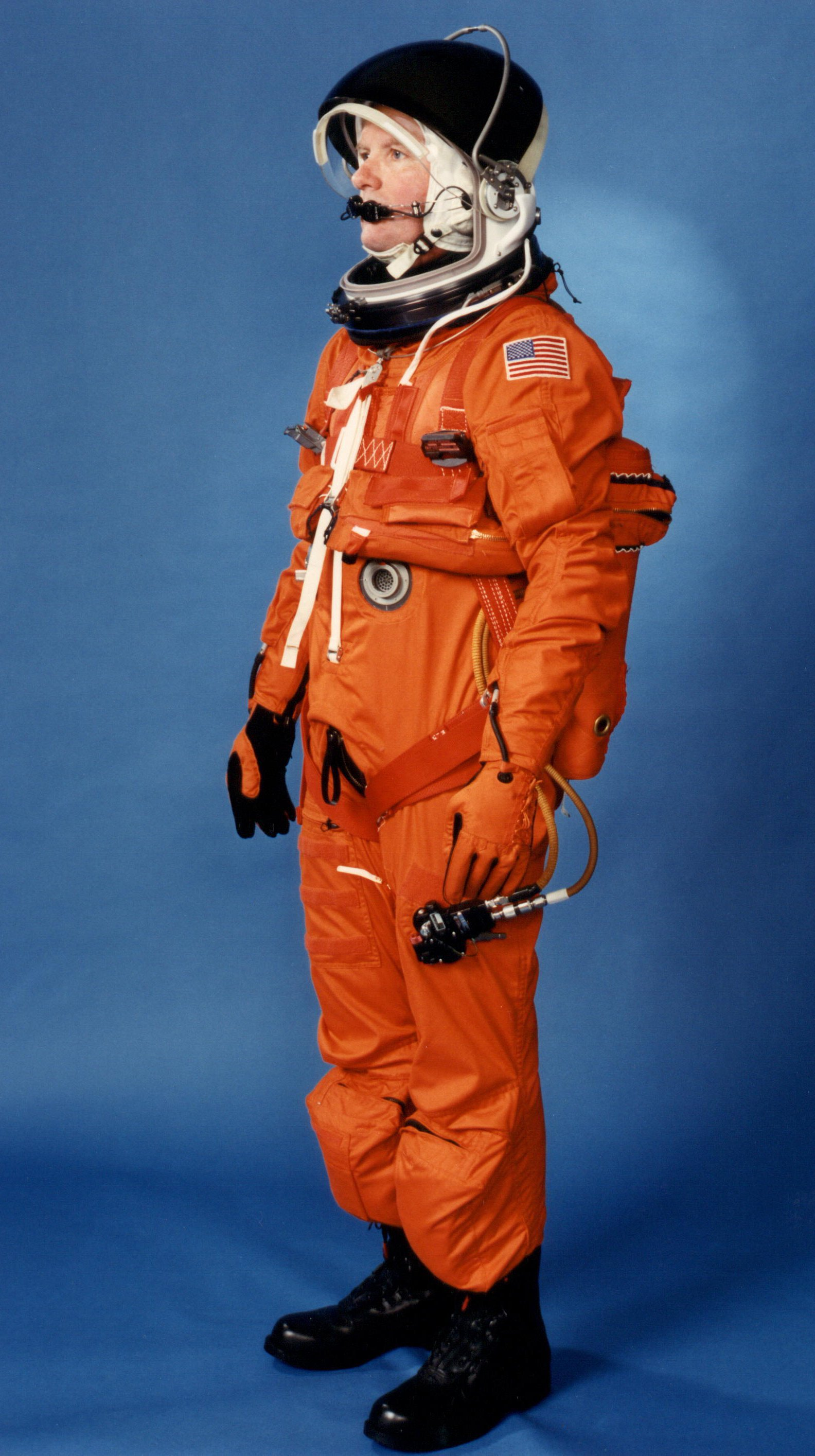
Launch Entry Suit modeled by technician

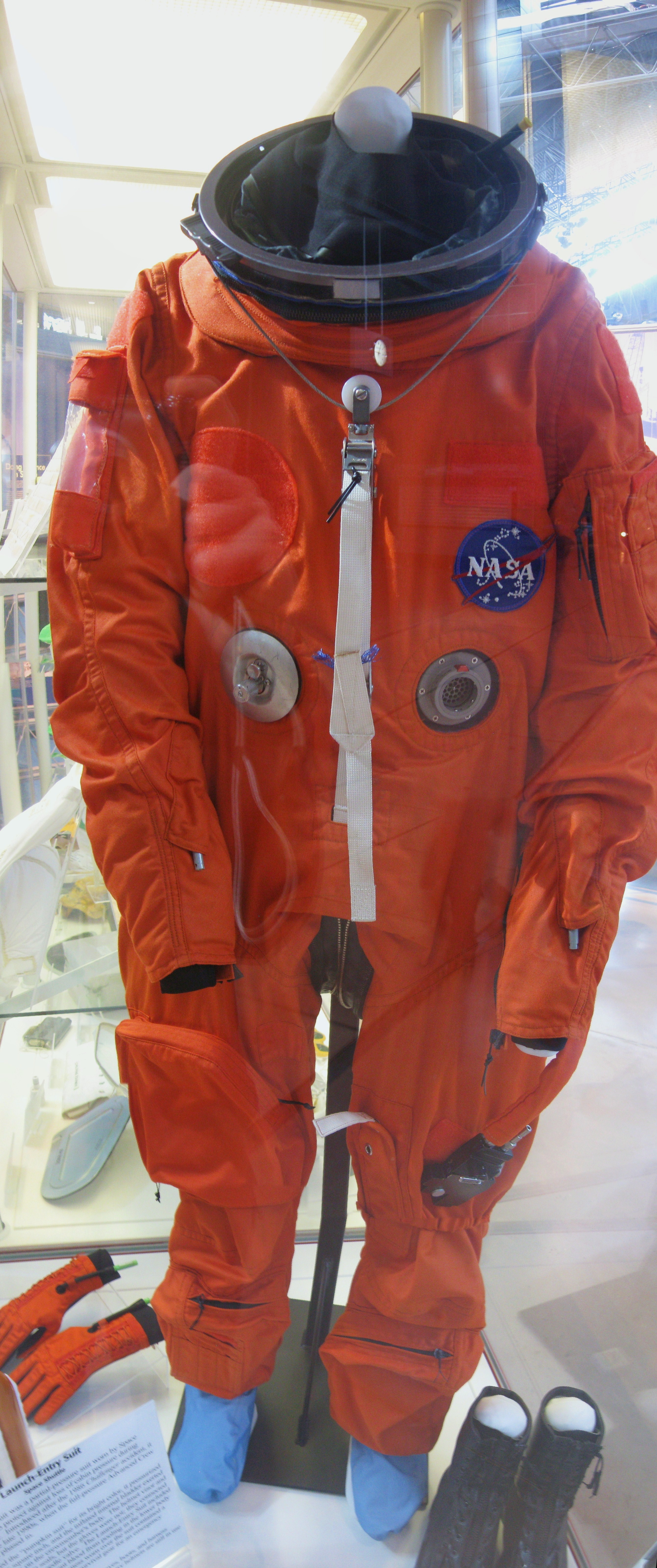
Launch Entry Suit at the Steven F. Udvar-Hazy Center

The Launch Entry Suit (LES), known as the "pumpkin suit", is a partial-pressure suit that was worn by all Space Shuttle crews for the ascent and entry portions of flight from STS-26 (1988) to STS-65 (1994). It was completely phased out by STS-88 (late 1998) and replaced by the ACES suit. The suit was manufactured by the David Clark Company of Worcester, Massachusetts.

== History ==
The LES was first worn by U.S. Air Force pilots in the mid-1970s, replacing a similar suit worn by SR-71 and U-2 pilots, and was identical to the suits worn by X-15 pilots and Gemini astronauts. Unlike the ACES suit, which is a full-pressure suit, the high-altitude suits were partial pressure suits, thus requiring a rubber diaphragm around the wearer's face.

With the development of the Space Shuttle, and the inclusion of ejection seats on the Space Shuttle Columbia on the first four flights (STS-1 to STS-4), NASA decided to adopt modified versions of the suit, the modifications being the attachments to the parachute harness, and the adoption of inflatable bladders in the legs to prevent the crew from passing out during reentry. One other modification, a mount for prescription glasses, was incorporated for astronaut John W. Young, who wore modified bifocal reading glasses (resembling aviator sunglasses, but with the top portion, usually for distance seeing, being of regular glass, and the bottom, for reading, of the wearer's prescription) during the flight.

The four test flights, between April 1981 and July 1982, went without incident, and the pressure suits performed without any problems. With the termination of the test flight program, all flights from STS-5 to STS-51-L (the Challenger disaster) saw the crew wearing one-piece light blue flight suits, escape harnesses, and helmets similar to the pressure suit helmets, but fitted around the head with a clamshell-like closure. After Challenger, NASA, in need of an escape system, also required the reintroduction of the wearing of pressure suits during the launch and landing portions of the flight. The initial eight suits were navy blue, similar in color to the previous flight suits, the rest of the suits were bright orange to contrast against the dark blue ocean water they'd most likely be used in. The blue suits were never used on an actual mission.

For the first "Return to Flight" STS-26, the five-man astronaut crew wore, for the first time, new Launch & Entry Pressure Suits (LES). Resembling the Gemini spacesuit in appearance, but identical in function to the SR-71 partial-pressure suits, the new LES suits featured a one-piece torso-limb suit with a Nomex outer layer (which NASA was able to use on the Shuttle due to the mixed nitrogen/oxygen sea-level atmosphere), closed with a rear-entry zipper, and featuring a full-pressure helmet with a polycarbonate clear faceplate, mechanical seal, and black sunshade, zippered-on gloves (resembling the gloves used by astronaut Alan Shepard on his Mercury space suit), heavy black "paratrooper" style safety boots, and a survival backpack, which was donned prior to entering the Orbiter and contained a parachute, life raft, survival gear, and a 30-minute supply of breathing oxygen and a water tank.

Because of the helmet design, which rested on the astronaut's shoulders and allowed them to move their head around freely, astronauts were now required to wear a communications cap similar to those worn by Apollo astronauts, and because they were white (later changed to brown), the suit resembled the Vostok pressure suit worn by Yuri Gagarin. The suits were designed to withstand pressures up to 40,000 feet (12 kilometers), and immersion in the ocean for up to 24 hours at 5 °C (40 °F).

Because of the limitations of protection the LES could offer, NASA and the David Clark Company introduced the current ACES design in 1995, which thereafter was the only suit used for Shuttle missions. Based on the LES, but being a full-pressure suit, the ACES suit incorporated gloves on disconnecting lock rings on the wrists, liquid cooling and improved ventilation, and an extra layer of insulation.

The ACES suit is analogous to the Sokol suits used for Soyuz missions and its functions were virtually the same, the only differences being the ACES suit having a detachable helmet and survival backpack, while the Russian suit has an integrated helmet and no backpack, due to the limitations in space aboard the Soyuz.

== Specifications ==
Each suit was sized individually, although most suits could be worn by astronauts of different heights. They included a parachute and flotation device.

Name: Launch Entry Suit (S1032)

Derived from: USAF Model S1031

Manufacturer: David Clark Company

Missions: STS-26 to STS-79, STS-81 to STS-83, STS-94 to STS-85, STS-87 to STS-90, STS-88

Function: Intra-vehicular activity (IVA)

Pressure type: Partial

Operating pressure: 2.7 psi (18.6 kPa)

Suit weight: 30 lb (13.6 kg)

Parachute and survival systems weight: 64 lb (29 kg)

Total weight: 94 lb (42.6 kg)

Primary life support: Vehicle Provided

Backup life support: 10 minutes

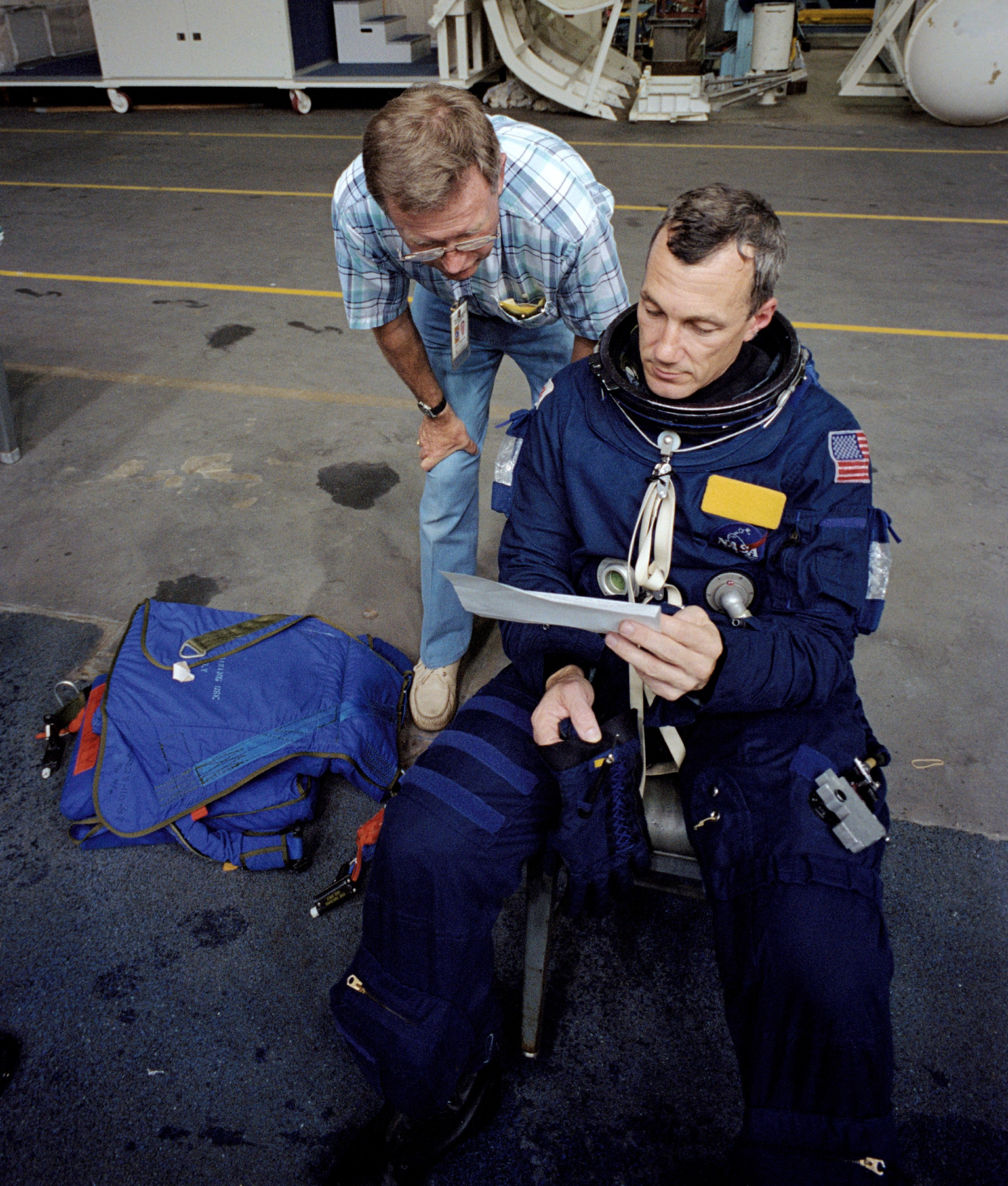
A navy blue suit being used in training by STS-68 pilot Terrence W. Wilcutt

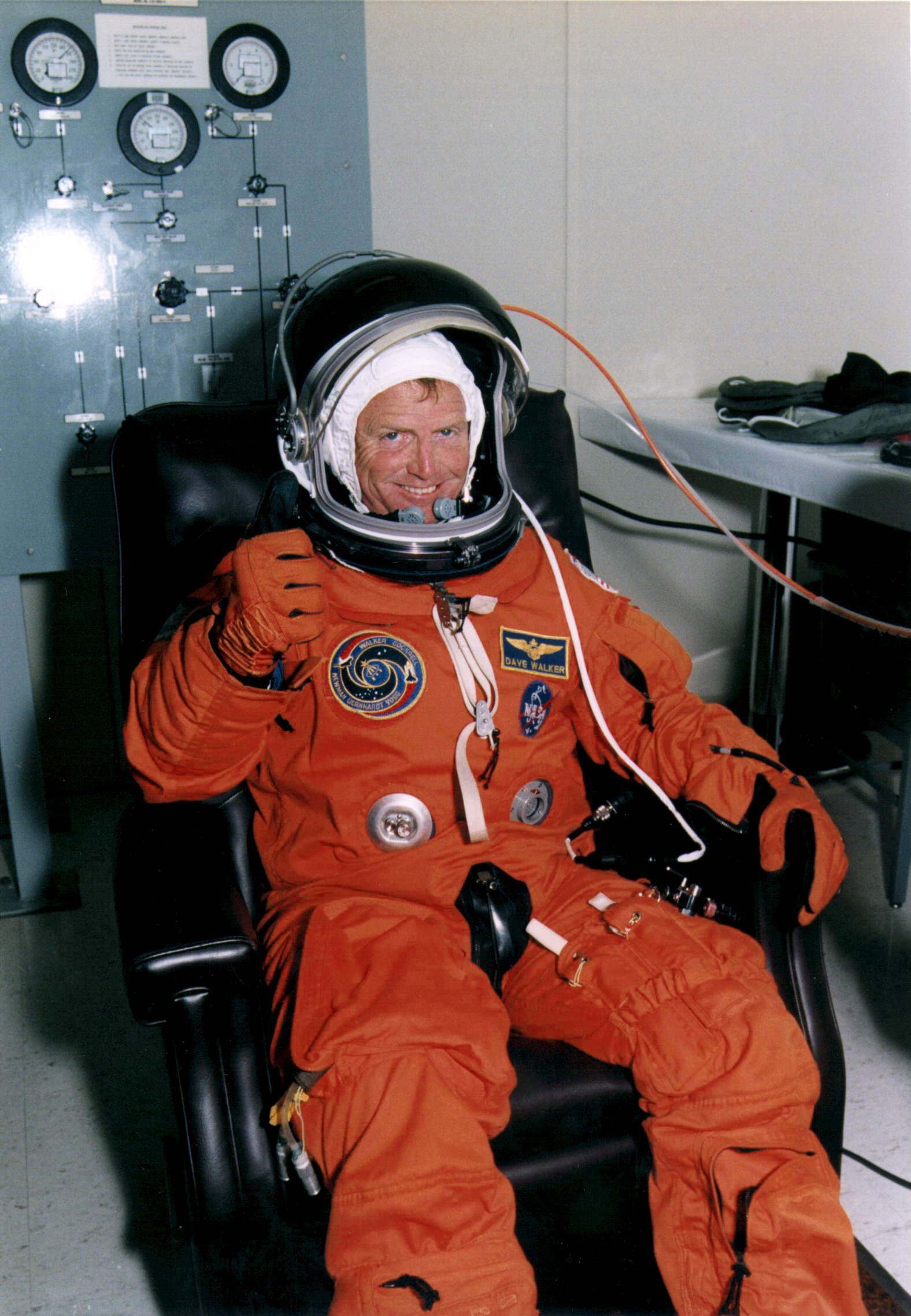
STS-69 mission commander David Walker

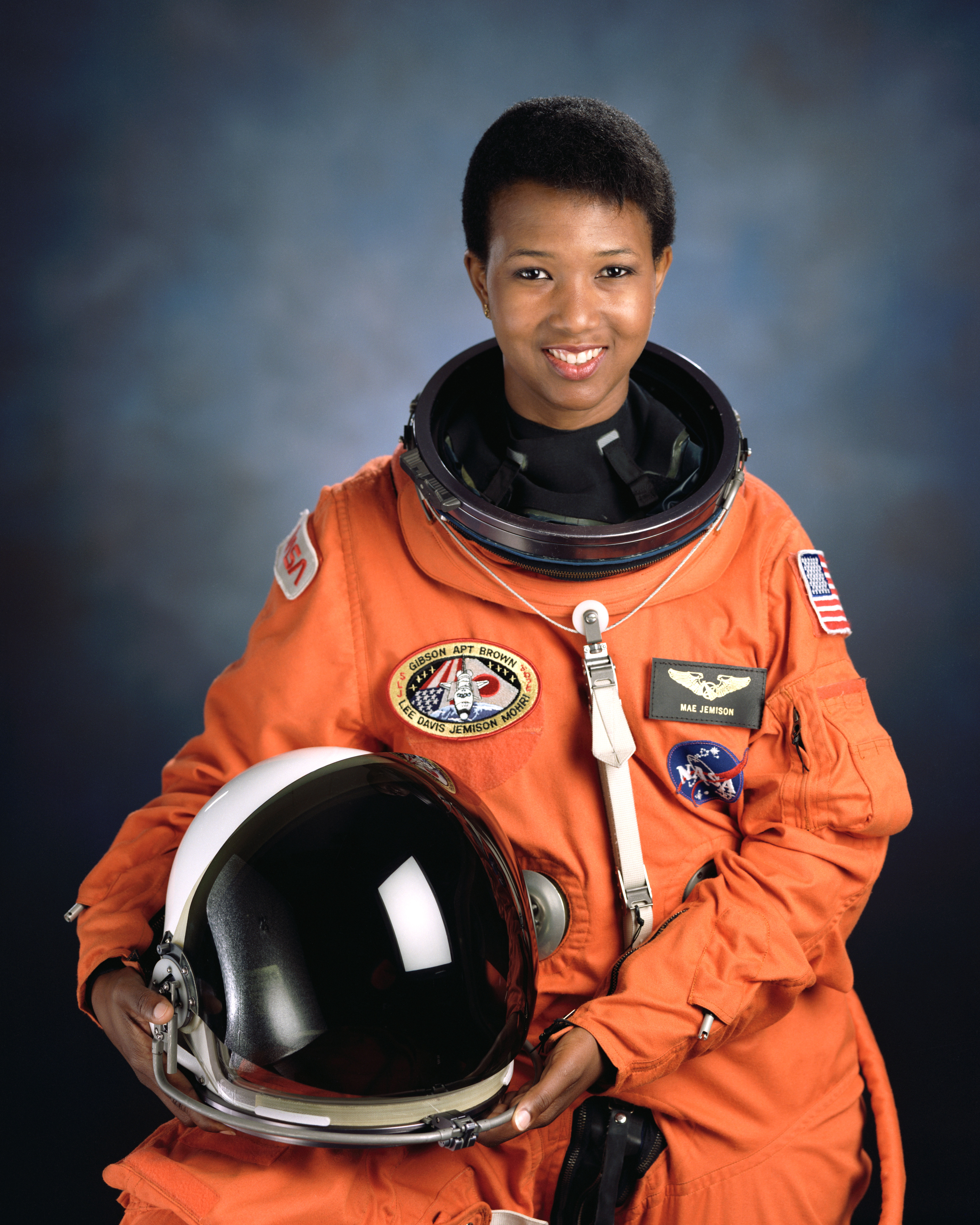
STS-47 mission specialist Mae Jemison
