= Skandi Neptune =

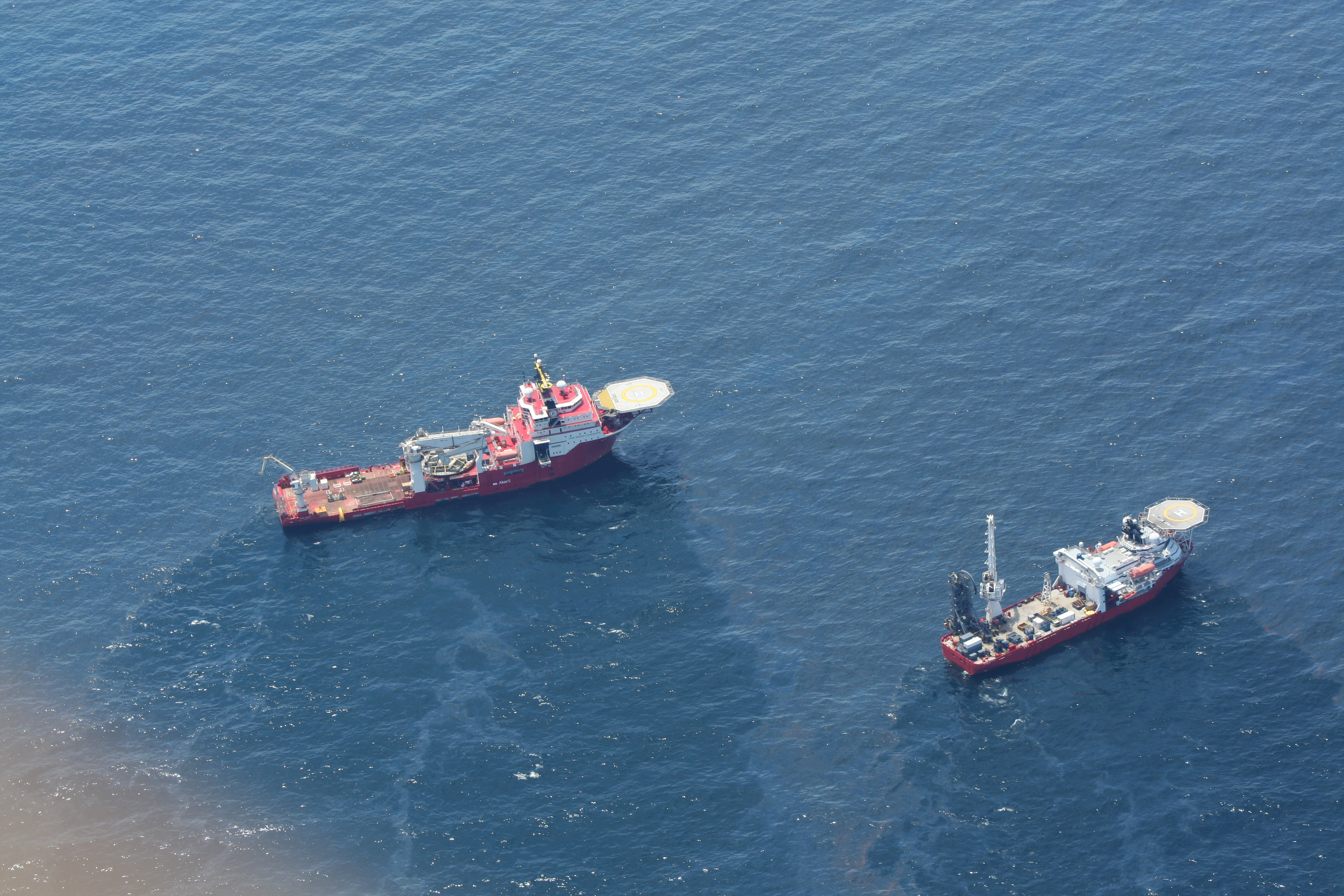
- Boa Sub C and Skandi Neptune in April 2010

History

Norway
- Name: MSV Skandi Neptune
- Owner: DOF Subsea
- Operator: DOF Subsea
- Port of registry: Bergen, Norway
- Builder: Aker Tulcea SA, Tulcea, Romania; Brattvaag Skipsverft AS, Norway
- Yard number: N243
- Launched: 28 October 2000
- Completed: November 2001
- Identification: IMO number: 9205720; MMSI number: 258142000; Callsign: LASG5
- Status: in service

General characteristics
- Class & type: +1A1, E0, DYNPOS AUTR, SF, DK+
- Type: Offshore Construction Vessel
- Tonnage: 5,090 t DWT; 6,318 GT
- Length: 104 m
- Beam: 24 m
- Draught: 7 m
- Installed power: 2 × 1,530 kW (Wärtsilä 9L20), 2 × 3600 kW (Wärtsila 8L32)
- Propulsion: azimuth thrusters and tunnel bow thrusters
- Speed: 14.5 / 12.4 knots (max/ave)
- Aviation facilities: Helideck

Skandi Neptune is an Offshore Construction Vessel that was operated by Subsea 7 from 2005 until the charter was ended in 2015.

== History ==
The Skandi Neptune was built in 2001 as a cable layer. In 2005, she was converted to a multi-purpose offshore support vessel and began a long term charter to Subsea 7.

In 2010, Skandi Neptune provided ROV capability during the oil spill following an explosion on the Deepwater Horizon in the Gulf of Mexico.

== Layout ==
Skandi Neptune has two stern azimuth thrusters, a retractable forward azimuth thruster and two bow tunnel thrusters. Combined with a class 2 DGPS system, these provide excellent manoeuvring capabilities.

She has accommodation for 106 persons in single and double cabins. The helideck is rated for Super Puma L2s.

The stern A-Frame is rated at 60 tonne SWL, the deck crane at 250 tonne SWL. The moon pool and 130 tonne traction winch allow the installation of flexible pipe.

== Service ==
Skandi Neptune can operate as a pipe-laying ship and provides ROV support.
