= Memorial Museum of Cosmonautics =

Museum dedicated to space exploration

Coordinates: 55.822733°N 37.63971°E

- Музей космонавтики
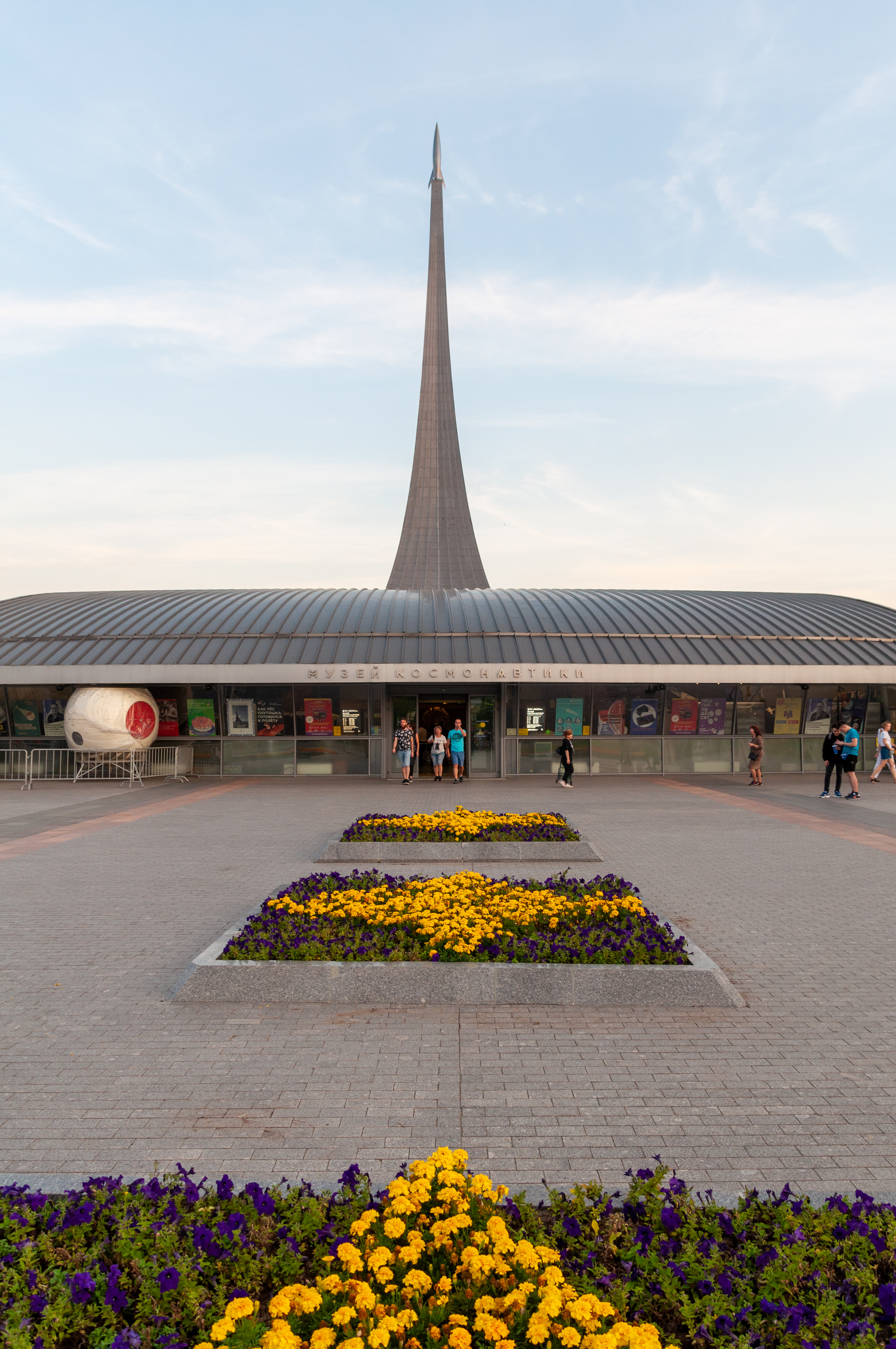
- The entrance to the Museum (2019)

Agency overview
- Formed: 1981
- Jurisdiction: Government of Russia
- Agency executive: Golovkina Irina, Director

The Memorial Museum of Cosmonautics (Russian: Музей космонавтики), also known as the Memorial Museum of Astronautics or Memorial Museum of Space Exploration, is a museum in Moscow, Russia, dedicated to space exploration. It is located within the base of the Monument to the Conquerors of Space in the north-east of the city. The museum contains a wide variety of Soviet and Russian space-related exhibits and models which explore the history of flight; astronomy; space exploration; space technology; and space in the arts. According to the Russian tourist board, the museum's collection holds approximately 85,000 different items and receives approximately 300,000 visitors yearly.

== History ==
The museum primarily focuses on the Soviet space program with major themes like the first person in space Yuri Gagarin, the rocket engineer Sergei Korolev, the satellite Sputnik and the spacecraft Soyuz.

== Renovation ==
On Cosmonautics Day, 2009, the museum was reopened after three years of reconstruction. It has virtually tripled its original size and has added new sections dedicated to space programs worldwide, including the USA, Europe, China and the International Space Station. The museum now features original interactive exhibits, as well as a refurbished promenade, the sculpture-lined Cosmonauts Alley which connects the museum to the Moscow metro. The museum is a favourite of students worldwide and a primary tourist attraction of the city.

== Exhibits ==
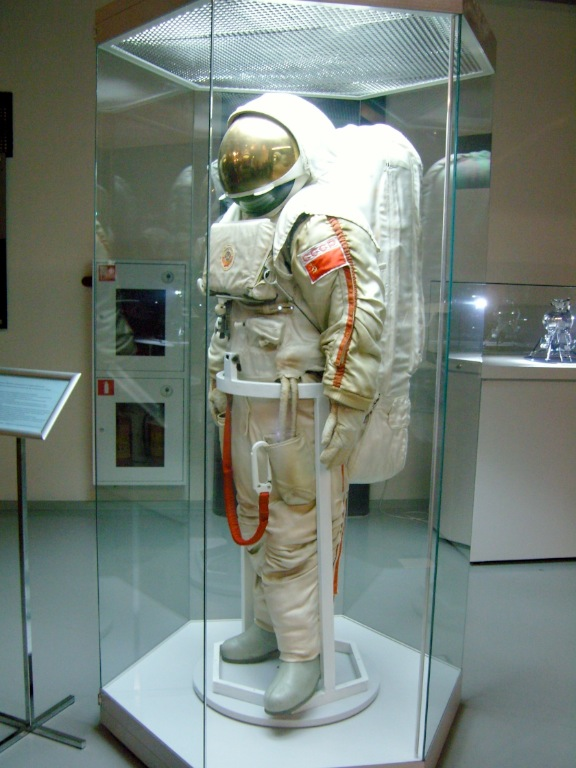
Soviet Krechet spacesuit

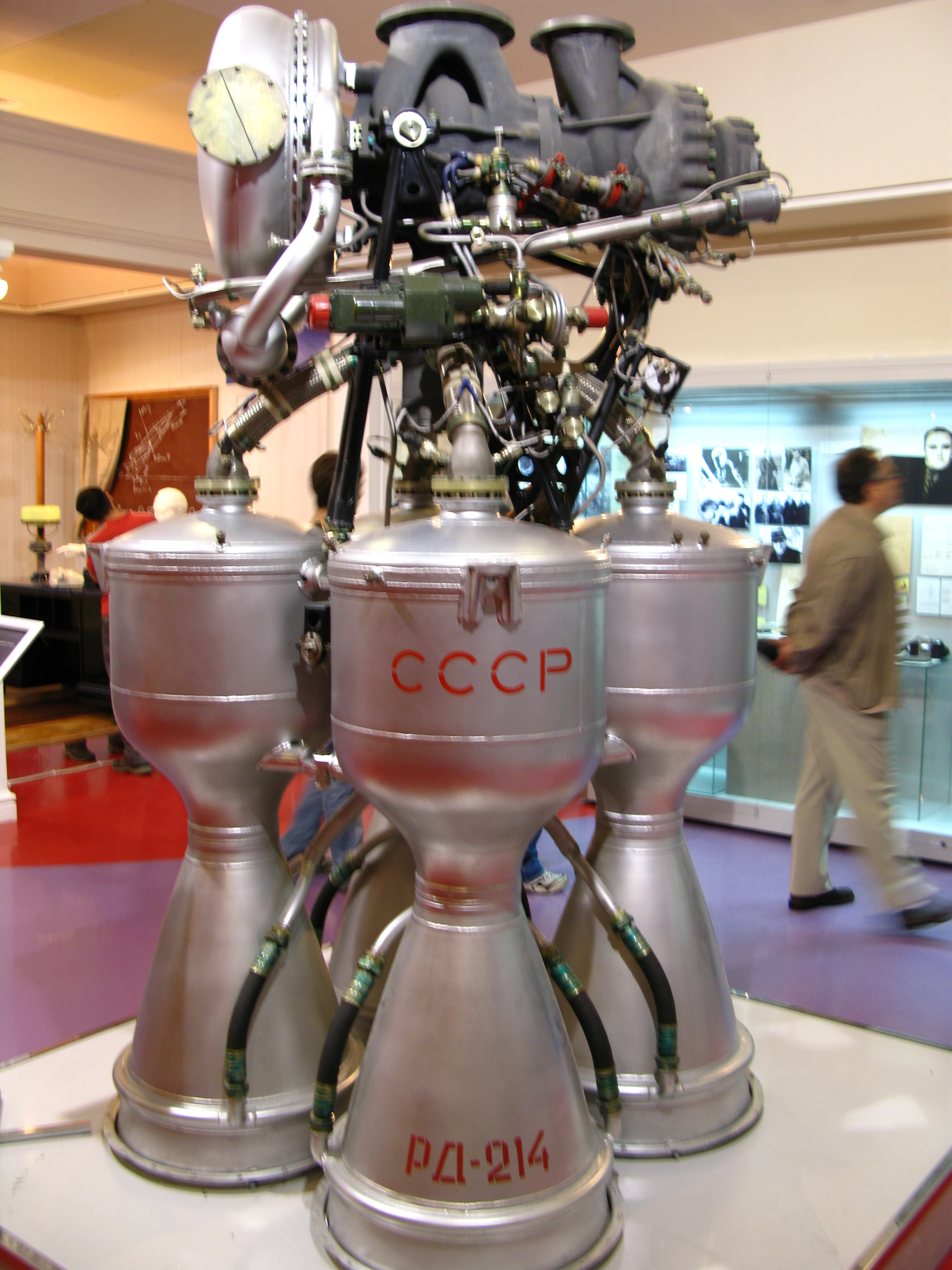
Rocket propulsion units, RD-214

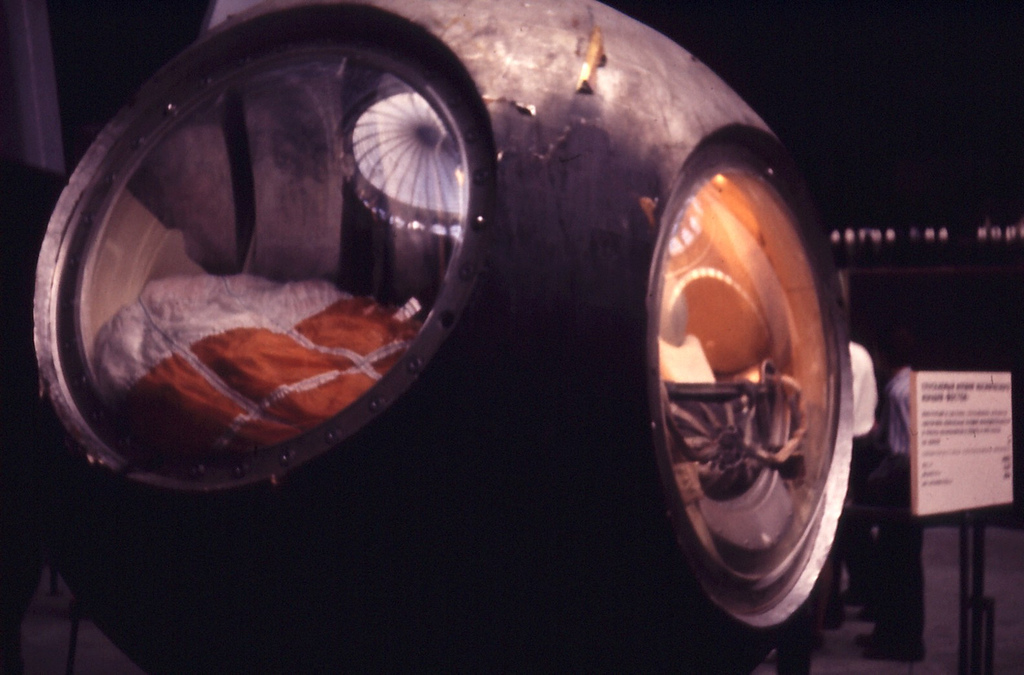
Space capsule used by Yuri Gagarin, 1961

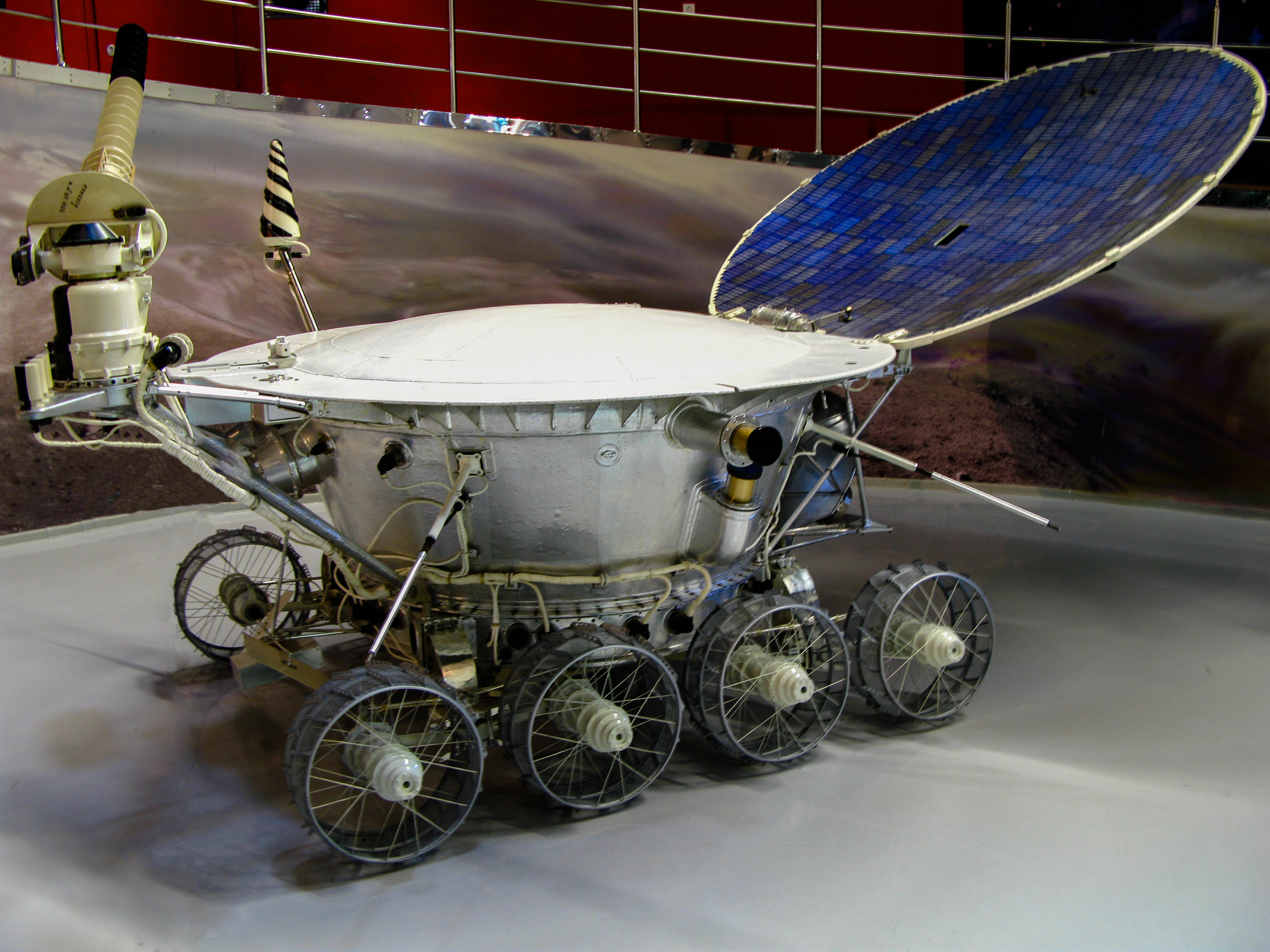
Soviet moonrover Lunokhod (Луноход)

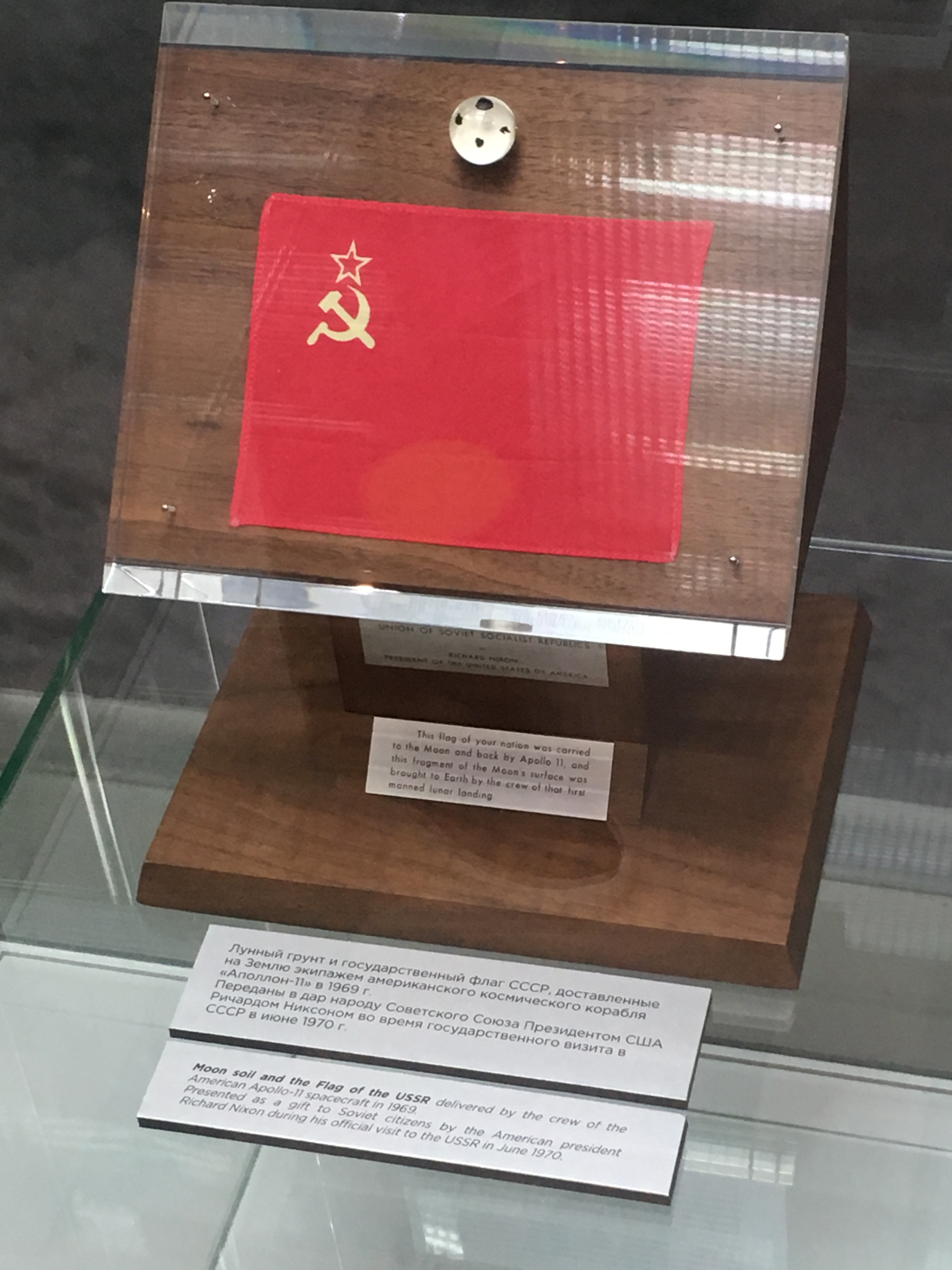
USSR flag display with Moon fragments. Presented as a gift to Soviet citizens by President Richard Nixon in June 1970

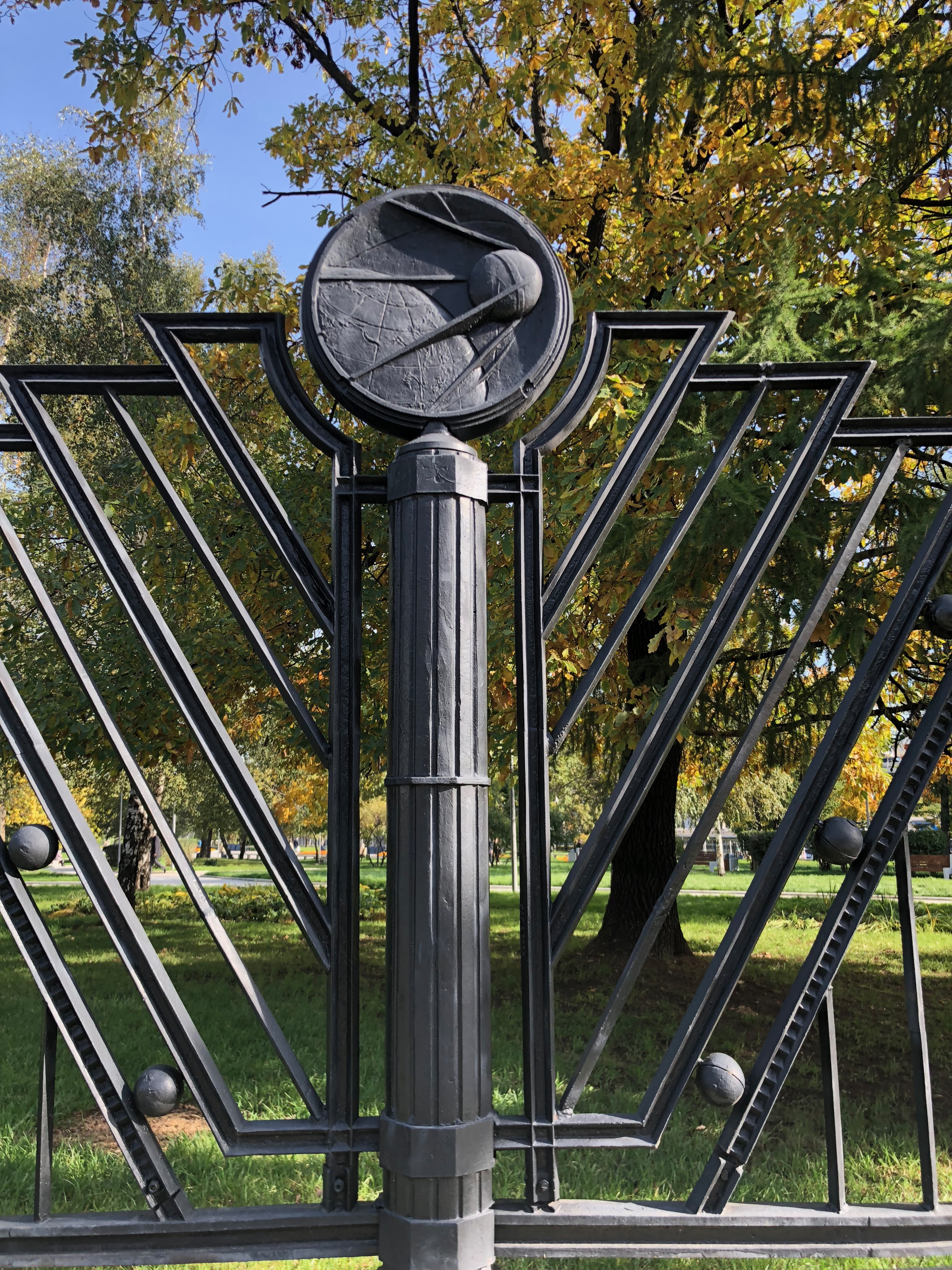
The engraved fence surrounding the complex. Engraved with a picture of Sputnik 1

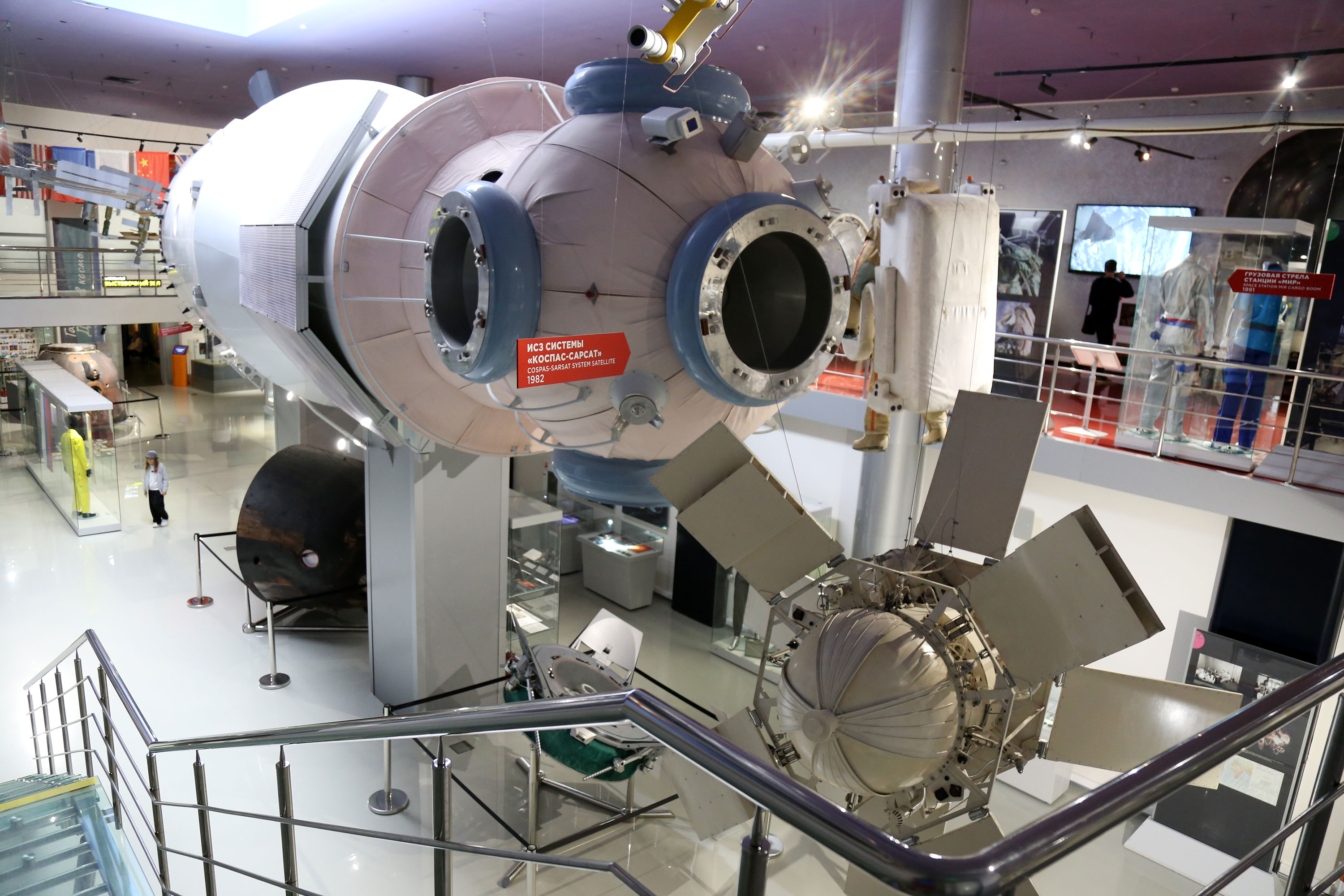
Museum of Cosmonautics, Moscow, Russia

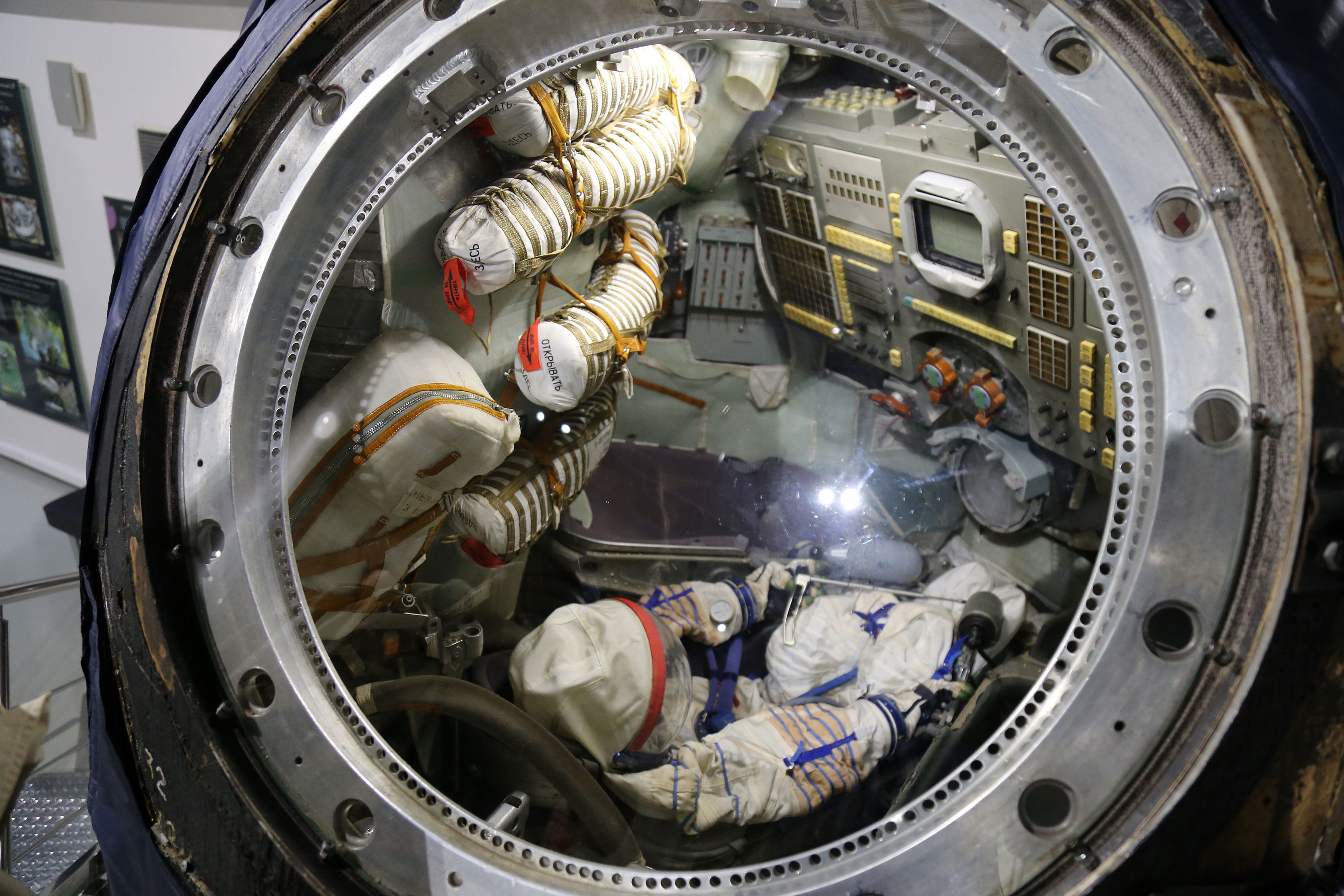
Museum of Cosmonautics, Moscow, Russia

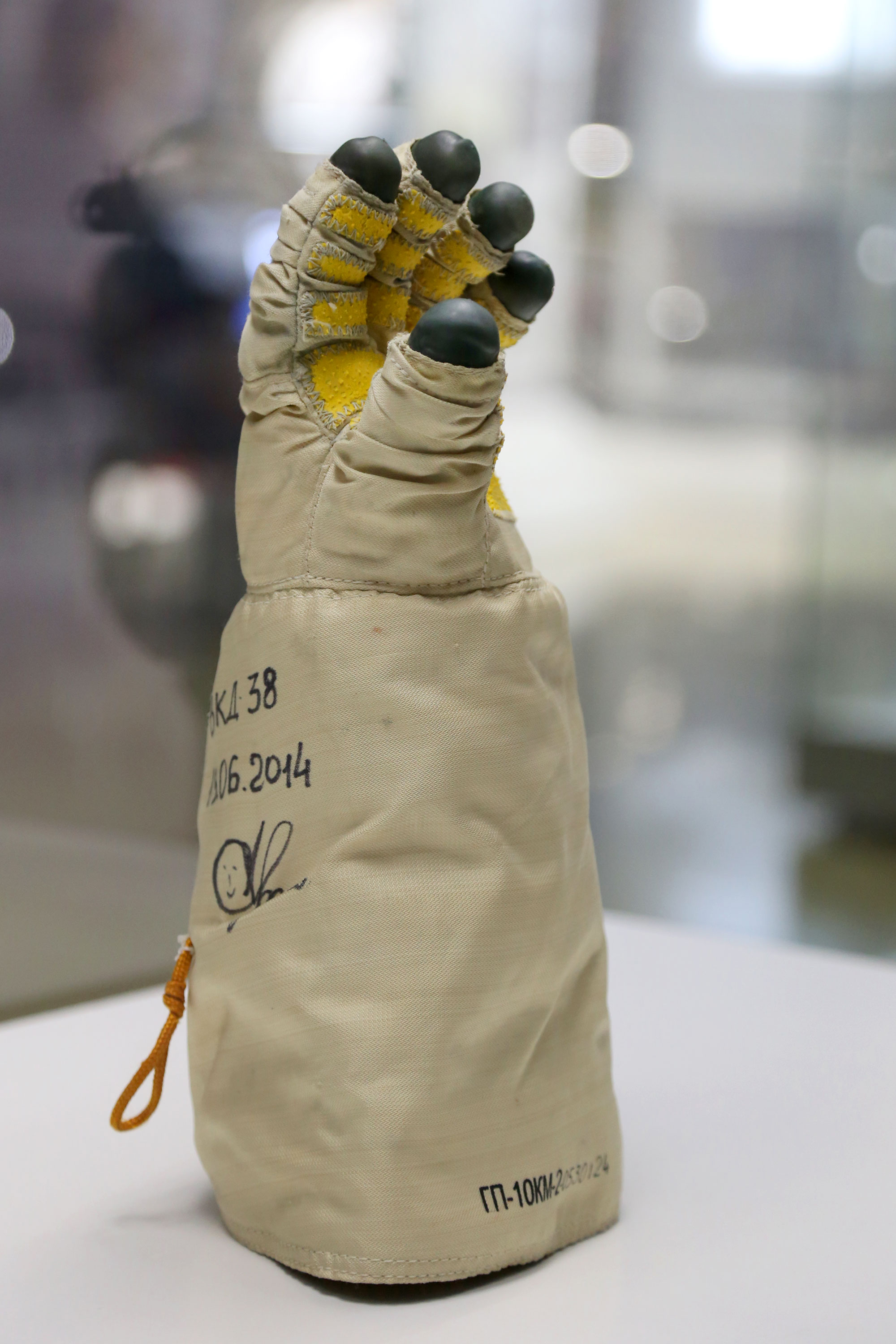
Museum of Cosmonautics, Moscow, Russia

== See also ==
- Monument to the Conquerors of Space
- Cosmonauts Alley
