= Krechet-94 =

Russian spacesuit model

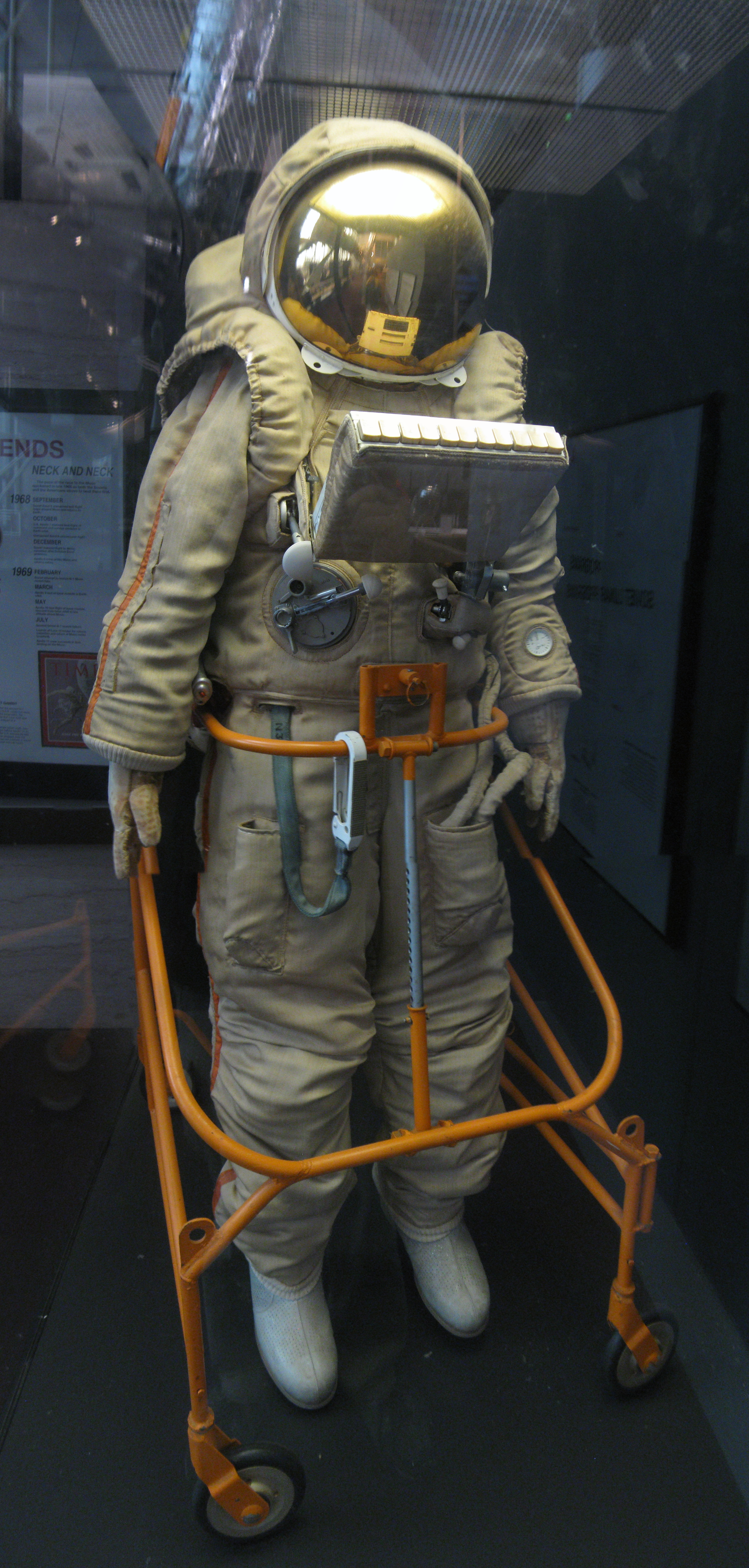
Krechet-94 Suit

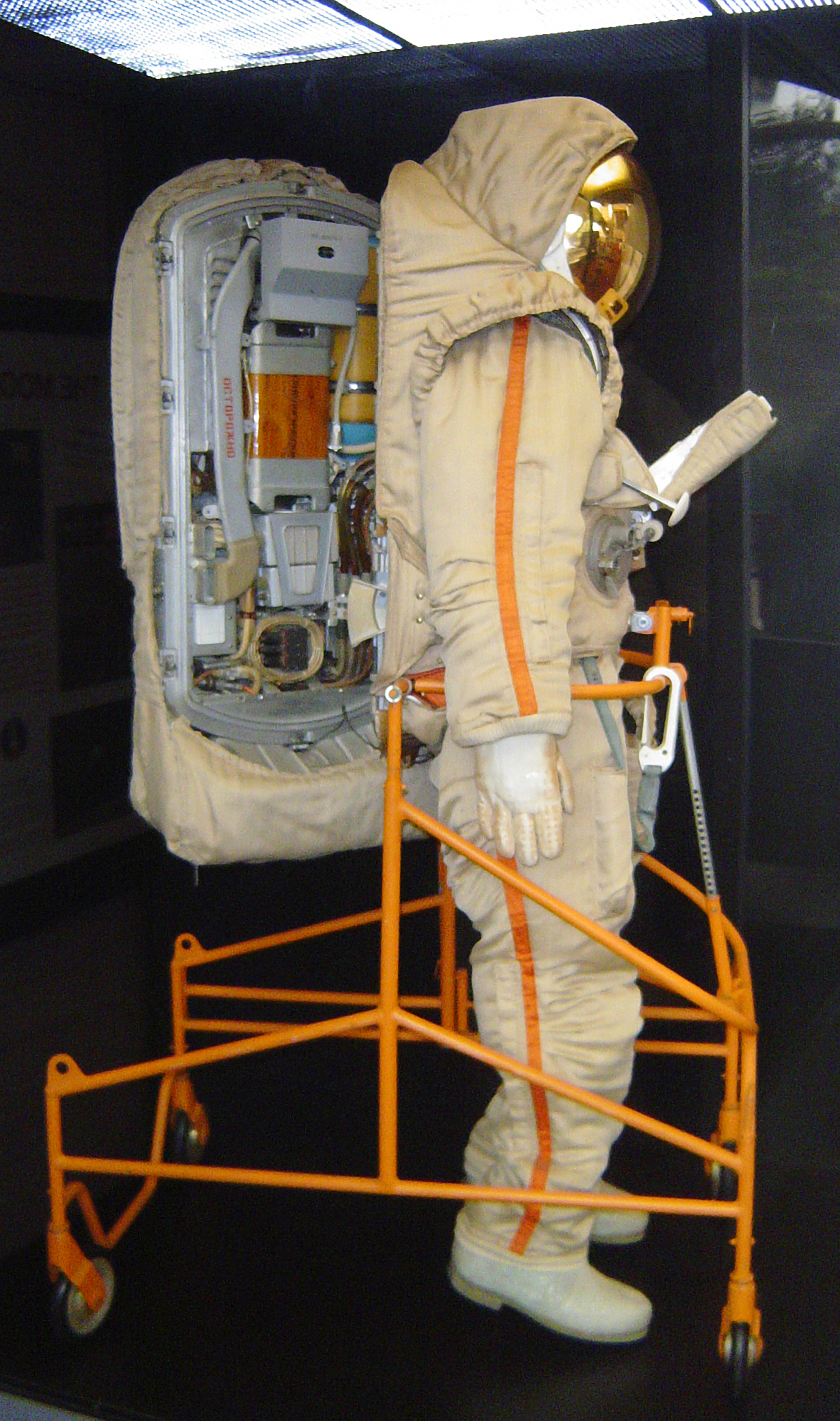

The Krechet-94 (Russian Кречет, meaning gyrfalcon) is a space suit model developed for lunar excursion during the Soviet crewed lunar program. It was designed by NPP Zvezda. Development began in 1967, concurrently with the Orlan suit for microgravity spacewalks. The developmental model was known simply as Krechet.

== Design features ==
Weighing 90 kg (198 lb), the suit could operate for 10 hours before requiring a resupply of consumables, and had a total operating lifetime of 48 hours. The Krechet was the first semi-rigid space suit ever developed, with an aluminum alloy hard upper torso and soft fabric limbs. This design was later adopted by the American EMU and later Russian suits. The Krechet included waist and hip joints which were not present in the Orlan. The shoulders and wrists of the suit included ball-bearing joints, which allowed for almost 360 degree rotation.

The Krechet was a rear-entry suit, meaning that cosmonauts would enter the suit through a hatch in the back. This entry was easier and more reliable than the use of a zipper. The hatch could then be opened by means of a lever by the right elbow. The life support backpack was incorporated into the hatch. The rear-entry hatch concept is attributed to Zvezda engineer Anatoli Stoklitskii.

The suit featured a chest-mounted control and instrument panel which could fold out for use or fold flat against the chest when not needed. The suit also featured a metal "hula hoop" ring on the back, which would allow a solo cosmonaut who fell on his back to roll onto his side and use his arms and legs to stand. The suit had two snap-down visors, providing differing levels of sun protection, in addition to a clear visor. The outer visor was coated in gold for reflectivity.

The suit was designed to be worn over a liquid cooling garment. The inner fabric of the suit was gray nylon canvas. The suit was insulated with waffle-textured foil. The outer layer was an off-white satin-weave fabric with orange trim.

Because of constraints in shoulder and elbow mobility in the Krechet, the Soviet lunar lander featured a "finger controller" which allowed a suited pilot to operate the lander. The Krechet would have served as a microgravity suit as well as a surface suit, as the Soviet lunar lander (LK) and command module (LOK) were not designed for intravehicular crew transfer.

== Development and testing ==
By 1969, two versions of lunar expedition spacesuits had undergone a full test cycle: Krechet for going to another planet and Orlan for orbital work. Krechet's systems provided a record-breaking autonomous stay of a person on the Moon - up to 10 hours, during which the researcher could perform work with great physical exertion. A water-cooled suit was used for thermoregulation . Two circuits were created: a circuit for circulation and regeneration of the air environment inside the spacesuit, as well as an oxygen supply to compensate for leaks and a water-cooling circuit.

Along with the creation of a semi-rigid "lunar" spacesuit, an original stand was created that reliably imitated lunar conditions and the possibility of a cosmonaut making a 5-kilometer lunar transition in a spacesuit was physically demonstrated, with the physical load not exceeding the permissible limits. The experience of creating a lunar spacesuit was not in vain, it formed the basis for the development of a spacesuit for servicing orbital stations, or the Orlan spacesuit.

To test the spacesuit, a full-scale model of the lunar lander was built, on which various tests and training of the crew were carried out. To simulate lunar gravity, which is 6 times less than the earth's, a special inclined tower was built. A person walked along its outer wall, making an angle of approximately 30 degrees with the vertical. At the same time, the earth's gravity "pulled" down and took most of the weight (in order not to fall, the person in the "Krechet" was suspended by a cable before these operations), and only a sixth of the weight remained on the support of the feet, which ensured "lunar conditions". Since the spacesuit turned out to be quite large, it was necessary to redesign the hatch. For the same reason, the placement of the instruments and units of the lunar cabin was also coordinated with the location of the person (again, to maintain the center of mass).

"Krechet" had its own radio communication systems, telemetry, drinking water supply and liquid waste removal device.

However, the Soviet crewed lunar program was ultimately canceled, even though the Krechet-94 spacesuits had been fully developed and were ready for the expedition. The experience gained in designing the semi-rigid Krechet-94 spacesuit was still valuable, as the semi-rigid architecture was well-suited for extravehicular activities on orbital stations.

== The legacy ==
When work on the first orbital station began in 1969, one of the most important problems was the long-term use and storage of a spacesuit on board without returning to Earth. The semi-rigid type of spacesuit is best suited for extravehicular activities related to the operation of a long-term orbital station. Semi-rigid spacesuits with built-in autonomous life support systems are optimal for reusable and long-term work in outer space.

Later, several modifications of the Orlan spacesuit type were made. All of them have a number of advantages, which ensures their successful use during long space flights. These include quick independent donning and doffing, the use of one size of spacesuit for astronauts with different anthropometric data, the possibility of servicing in orbit without returning to Earth, and the ease of replacing replaceable and failed elements.

The most difficult part was maintaining the water circulating in the hydraulic system for a long time, which ensured the necessary thermal balance in outer space. Finally, the difficulties were eliminated with the help of silver water ionization technologies and thanks to the latest non-metallic materials from which the pipes, connectors and other elements of the hydraulic system were made.

Any space devices created using special, often unique, technologies with the use of rare construction materials are incredibly expensive. Although, as a rule, only general indicators of the costs of a particular project become available to the public. As for the cost of components, specific systems or units, their creators usually remain silent on this matter. Therefore, the price of purchasing, for example, one " Orlan-M " cannot be named. There is, however, information about similar American products. Thus, a modern NASA astronaut spacesuit, close in characteristics to the "Orlan-M", costs 12-15 million dollars.

== Specifications ==
- Name: Krechet-94/Krechet Spacesuit
- Derived from: SKV EVA (developmental) Spacesuit
- Manufacturer: NPP Zvezda
- Missions: Never used
- Function: Lunar extra-vehicular activity (EVA)
- Operating Pressure: 400 hPa (5.8 psi)
- Total Weight: 106 kg (234 lb) (approx. 17.7 kg (39 lb) on the Lunar surface)
- Primary Life Support: 10 hours (600 minutes)

== Images ==
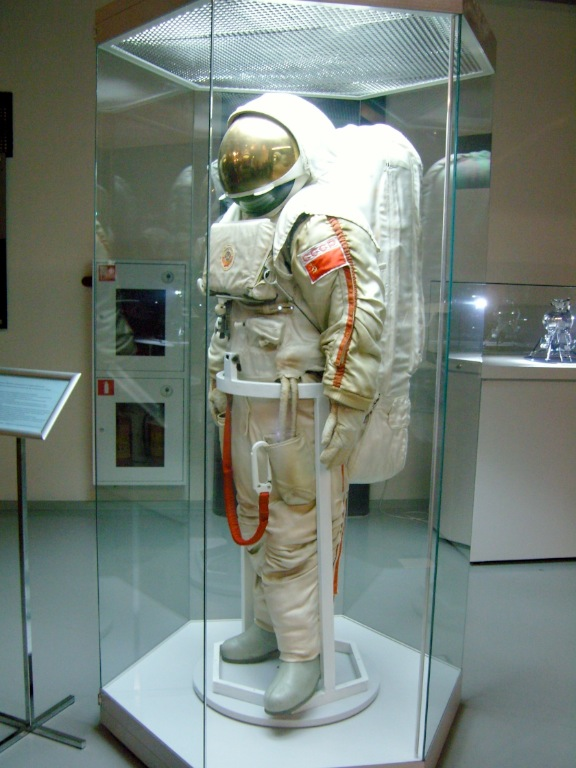
A suit model located at Memorial Museum of Cosmonautics in Moscow.

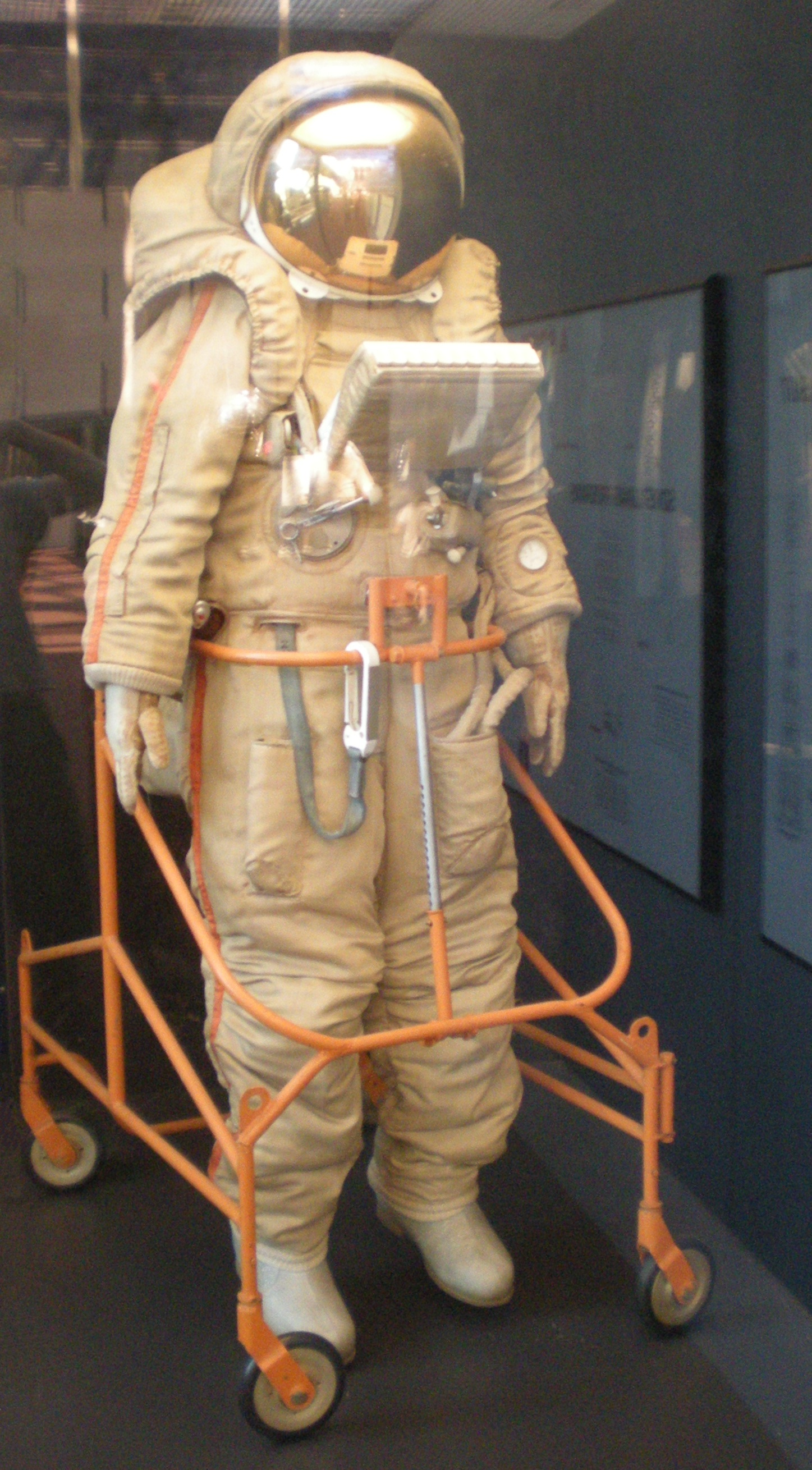
Suit located at the National Air and Space Museum in Washington, D.C.
