= List of commemorative coins of the Soviet Union =

Commemorative coins were released in the USSR between 1965 and 1991. Most of them were made of copper-nickel alloy, but there were also silver coins, gold coins, palladium coins and platinum coins. All of the coins were minted either by the Moscow Mint (Московский монетный двор, ММД) or by the Leningrad Mint (Ленинградский монетный двор, ЛМД). Certain parts of the mintage of almost each coin were minted using the proof coinage technology.

== Coins made of copper-nickel alloy ==
Year	Denomination	Commemorative subject	Reverse	Mintage	Image
1965	1 ruble	20th anniv. of Soviet people's Victory over fascist Germany in the Great Patriotic War (1941–1945)	"The Soldier Liberator" monument by Yevgeny Vuchetich in Treptower Park	60,000,000 (11,250 proof)	
1967	10 copecks	50 years of Soviet power	Monument "To the Conquerors of Space", rising sun in the background	50,000,000 (211,250 of them proof)	
1967	15 copecks	50 years of Soviet power	Worker and Kolkhoz Woman monument, dates: "1917", "1967"	50,000,000 (211,250 proof)	
1967	20 copecks	50 years of Soviet power	Aurora cruiser	50,000,000 (211,250 proof)	
1967	50 copecks	50 years of Soviet power	Vladimir Lenin	50,000,000 (211,250 proof)	
1967	1 ruble	50 years of Soviet power	Vladimir Lenin	52,500,000 (211,250 proof)	
1970	1 ruble	100th anniv. of V. I. Lenin's birth	Vladimir Lenin, dates: "1870–1970"	100,000,000 (111,250 proof)	
1975	1 ruble	30th anniv. of Soviet people's Victory over fascist Germany in the Great Patriotic War (1941–1945)	The Motherland Calls sculpture by Yevgeny Vuchetich on Mamayev Kurgan, five-pointed star with hammer and sickle in the center, dates: "1941–1945"	16,000,000 (1,011,250 proof)	
1977	1 ruble	60th anniv. of the Great October Socialist Revolution	Vladimir Lenin, Aurora, Monument to the Conquerors of Space, Atom symbol	5,000,000 (13,250 proof)	
1977	1 ruble	Games of the 22nd Olympiad in Moscow	Emblem	9,000,000 (335,000 proof)	
1978	1 ruble	Games of the 22nd Olympiad in Moscow	Moscow Kremlin	7,000,000 (509,500 proof)	
1979	1 ruble	Games of the 22nd Olympiad in Moscow	MSU building	5,000,000 (334,500 proof)	
1979	1 ruble	Games of the 22nd Olympiad in Moscow	Monument "To the Conquerors of Space", Sputnik 1, Salyut-Soyuz joint flight	5,000,000 (334,500 proof)	
1980	1 ruble	Games of the 22nd Olympiad in Moscow	Moscow Soviet building, monument to Yury Dolgoruky	5,000,000 (509,500 proof)	
1980	1 ruble	Games of the 22nd Olympiad in Moscow	Olympic Torch in Moscow	5,000,000 (509,500 proof)	
1981	1 ruble	20th anniv. of the first human flight into space (USSR citizen Yuri Gagarin)	Yuri Gagarin, Salyut station with two Soyuz spacecraft docked, dates: "1961", "1981"	4,000,000 (38,000 proof)	
1981	1 ruble	Friendship for ever (Soviet-Bulgarian friendship)	Flag of the Soviet Union, Flag of Bulgaria, handshake	2,000,000 (16,000 proof)	
1982	1 ruble	60th anniv. of the formation of the USSR	Vladimir Lenin in sunrays of the rising sun	2,000,000 (79,000 proof)	
1983	1 ruble	100th anniv. of Karl Marx's death	Karl Marx, dates: "1818", "1883"	2,000,000 (79,000 proof)	
1983	1 ruble	20th anniv. of the first woman's flight into space (USSR citizen Valentina Tereshkova)	Valentina Tereshkova in space suit, stars, date: "16-19.VI.1963"	2,000,000 (55,000 proof)	
1983	1 ruble	400th anniv. of Ivan Fyodorov's death	Ivan Fyodorov, dates: "1510", "1583"	2,000,000 (35,000 proof)	
1984	1 ruble	150th anniv. of Dmitry Mendeleyev's birth	Dmitry Mendeleyev, dates: "1834", "1907"	2,000,000 (35,000 proof)	
1984	1 ruble	125th anniv. of Alexander Popov's birth	Alexander Popov, dates: "1859", "1906"	2,000,000 (35,000 proof)	
1984	1 ruble	185th anniv. of Aleksandr Pushkin's birth	Aleksandr Pushkin, dates: "1799", "1837"	2,000,000 (35,000 proof)	
1985	1 ruble	115th anniv. of V. I. Lenin's birth	V. I. Lenin, dates: "1870", "1924"	2,000,000 (40,000 proof)	
1985	1 ruble	40th anniv. of Soviet people's Victory over fascist Germany in the Great Patriotic War (1941–1945)	Order of the Patriotic War in sunrays, dates: "1945–1985"	6,000,000 (40,000 proof)	
1985	1 ruble	12th World Festival of Youth and Students in Moscow	Emblem	6,000,000 (40,000 proof)	
1985	1 ruble	165th anniv. of Friedrich Engels's birth	Friedrich Engels, dates: "1820", "1895"	2,000,000 (40,000 proof)	
1986	1 ruble	International Year of Peace	Emblem	4,000,000 (45,000 proof)	
1986	1 ruble	275th anniv. of Mikhail Lomonosov's birth	Mikhail Lomonosov, dates: "1711", "1765"	2,000,000 (35,000 proof)	
1987	1 ruble	175th anniv. of the Battle of Borodino	monument to Mikhail Kutuzov at Borodino, date: "1812"	4,000,000 (220,000 proof)	
1987	1 ruble	175th anniv. of the Battle of Borodino	bas relief — fragment of monument to Kutuzov in Moscow	4,000,000 (220,000 proof)	
1987	1 ruble	130th anniv. of Konstantin Tsiolkovsky's birth	monument to Tsiolkovsky in Moscow, flying rocket, stars, dates: "1857", "1935"	4,000,000 (170,000 proof)	
1987	1 ruble	70th anniv. of the Great October Socialist Revolution	A hammer and sickle and the cruiser Aurora superimposed on a globe, the date "1917" on a banner, Russian text "70 ЛЕТ" (70 years) and "ВЕЛИКОЙ ОКТЯБРЬСКОЙ СОЦИАЛИСТИЧЕСКОЙ РЕВОЛЮЦИИ" (Great October Socialist Revolution)	4,000,000 (200,000 proof)	
1988	1 ruble	120th anniv. of Maksim Gorky's birth	Maksim Gorky, flying stormy petrel, dates: "1868–1936"	4,000,000 (225,000 proof)	
1988	1 ruble	160th anniv. of Leo Tolstoy's birth	Leo Tolstoy, dates: "1828–1910"	4,000,000 (225,000 proof)	
1989	1 ruble	175th anniv. of Taras Shevchenko's birth	Taras Shevchenko and his signature, dates: "1814", "1861"	3,000,000 (300,000 proof)	
1989	1 ruble	150th anniv. of Modest Musorgsky's birth	Modest Musorgsky and his signature, dates: "1839", "1881", banknotes	3,000,000 (300,000 proof)	
1989	1 ruble	175th anniv. of Mikhail Lermontov's birth	Mikhail Lermontov and his signature, dates: "1814", "1841"	3,000,000 (300,000 proof)	
1989	1 ruble	100th anniv. of Hamza Hakimzadeh Niyazi's birth	Hamza Hakimzadeh Niyazi, opened book and flower, dates: "1889", "1929"	2,000,000 (200,000 proof)	
1989	1 ruble	100th anniv. of Mihai Eminescu's death	Mihai Eminescu and his signature, dates: "1850", "1889"	2,000,000 (200,000 proof)	
1990	1 ruble	130th anniv. of Anton Chekhov's birth	Anton Chekhov and his signature, table lamp and books, dates: "1860", "1904"	3,000,000 (400,000 proof)	
1990	1 ruble	150th anniv. of Pyotr Chaikovsky's birth	Pyotr Chaikovsky and his signature, musical notation, dates: "1840", "1893"	3,000,000 (400,000 proof)	
1990	1 ruble	45th anniv. of Soviet people's Victory over fascist Germany in the Great Patriotic War (1941–1945)	Marshal of the Soviet Union Georgi Zhukov, dates: "1896", "1974"	2,000,000 (400,000 proof)	
1990	1 ruble	500th anniv. of Francysk Skaryna's birth	Francysk Skaryna, holding a book and a pencil, dates: "1490", "1551"	3,000,000 (400,000 proof)	
1990	1 ruble	125th anniv. of Jānis Rainis's birth	Jānis Rainis and his signature, dates: "1865", "1929"	3,000,000 (400,000 proof)	
1991	1 ruble	550th anniv. of Alisher Navoi's birth	Alisher Navoi, dates: "1441", "1501"	2,500,000 (350,000 proof)	
1991	1 ruble	125th anniv. of Pyotr Lebedev's birth	Pyotr Lebedev, pressure of light formula experimentally confirmed by him, device constructed by him to measure the pressure of light, dates: "1866", "1912"	2,500,000 (350,000 proof)	
1991	1 ruble	100th anniv. of Sergei Prokofiev's birth	Sergei Prokofiev, dates "1891" and "1953" separated by a clef	2,500,000 (350,000 proof)	
1991	1 ruble	Turkmen poet Makhtumkuli	Makhtumkuli, dates: "1733" and "1798"	2,500,000 (350,000 proof)	
1991	1 ruble	100th anniv. of Konstantin Ivanov, Chuvash poet	Konstantin Ivanov, dates: "1890", "1915"	2,500,000 (350,000 proof)	
1991	1 ruble	850th anniv. of Nizami Ganjavi's birth	Nizami Ganjavi holding a quill	2,500,000 (350,000 proof)	
1991	1 ruble	Games of the 25th Olympiad in Barcelona	cycling; a modern cyclist on bicycle and Ancient Greek chariot are depicted	250,000 proof	
1991	1 ruble	Games of the 25th Olympiad in Barcelona	javelin throw; modern and Ancient Greek javelin throwers are depicted	250,000 proof	
1991	1 ruble	Games of the 25th Olympiad in Barcelona	wrestling; modern and Ancient Greek wrestlers are depicted	250,000 proof	
1991	1 ruble	Games of the 25th Olympiad in Barcelona	long jump; triple jump by a modern athlete and long jump by Ancient Greek athlete are depicted	250,000 proof	
1991	1 ruble	Games of the 25th Olympiad in Barcelona	weightlifting; modern athlete lifting a barbell and Ancient Greek athlete lifting stones while standing on one bent leg are depicted	250,000 proof	
1991	1 ruble	Games of the 25th Olympiad in Barcelona	running; a modern runner and two Ancient Greek runners are depicted	250,000 proof	
1987	3 rubles	70th anniv. of the Great October Socialist Revolution	worker, soldier and sailor with rifles, date: "1917"	2,500,000 (200,000 proof)	
1989	3 rubles	The earthquake in Armenia	five hands, symbolizing the help from five continents, are holding the cauldron with eternal flame; ruines of houses, wing-like mountains of Armenia in the background, date: "7.12.1988"	3,000,000 (300,000 proof)	
1991	3 rubles	50th anniv. of Victory in the Battle of Moscow	marching Soviet soldiers, anti-tank obstacle, airship in the air, Spasskaya Tower and Kremlin Wall, dates: "1941", "1991"	2,500,000 (350,000 proof)	
1987	5 rubles	70th anniv. of the Great October Socialist Revolution	Vladimir Lenin, date: 1917	1,500,000 (200,000 proof)	
1988	5 rubles	Monument to Peter the Great in Leningrad	Bronze Horseman in the Decembrists Square in Leningrad, Peter and Paul Fortress in the background, date: "1782"	2,000,000 (325,000 proof)	
1988	5 rubles	Millennium of Russia monument in Novgorod	the monument, date: "1862"	2,000,000 (325,000 proof)	
1988	5 rubles	Saint Sophia Cathedral in Kiev	the cathedral	2,000,000 (325,000 proof)	
1989	5 rubles	The Cathedral of Intercession on the Mound	the cathedral, date: "1561"	2,000,000 (300,000 proof)	
1989	5 rubles	Registan Ensemble in Samarkand	the ensemble	2,000,000 (300,000 proof)	
1989	5 rubles	Cathedral of the Annunciation in Moscow	the cathedral, date: "1489"	2,000,000 (300,000 proof)	
1990	5 rubles	Peterhof Palace	the palace and a fountain in the foreground	3,000,000 (400,000 proof)	
1990	5 rubles	Cathedral of the Dormition in Moscow	the cathedral	3,000,000 (400,000 proof)	
1990	5 rubles	Matenadaran Institute of Ancient Manuscripts in Yerevan	the institute, ancient manuscript, eagle, shield and sword	3,000,000 (400,000 proof)	
1991	5 rubles	Cathedral of the Archangel in Moscow	the cathedral, date: "1508"	2,500,000 (350,000 proof)	
1991	5 rubles	The State Bank of the USSR building	patterned gates and the building	2,500,000 (350,000 proof)	
1991	5 rubles	Statue of David of Sassoun in Yerevan, Armenia	the monument, date: "1959"	2,500,000 (350,000 proof)	
1991	5 rubles	Red Data Book of the Russian Federation	Markhor on top of a rock, outer part:copper-nickel alloy, inner part: copper-zinc alloy	550,000 (50,000 proof)	
1991	5 rubles	Red Data Book of the Russian Federation of the USSR	Blakiston's fish owl, aquatic plants in the background, outer part:copper-nickel alloy, inner part: copper-zinc alloy	550,000 (50,000 proof)	

== Silver coins ==
Year	Denom.	Commemorative subject	Reverse	Mintage	mf	weight (g)	Image
1988	3 rubles	1000th anniv. of ancient Russian architecture	Saint Sophia Cathedral in Kiev	35,000	900	31.1	
1988	3 rubles	1000th anniv. of ancient Russian Mintage	Vladimir's Srebrenik	35,000	900	31.1	
1989	3 rubles	500th anniv. of Russian State	first All-Russian coins	40,000	900	31.1	
1989	3 rubles	500th anniv. of Russian State	Moscow Kremlin	40,000	900	31.1	
1990	3 rubles	500th anniv. of Russian State	Peter the Great Fleet	40,000	900	31.1	
1990	3 rubles	500th anniv. of Russian State	Petropavlovsk Fortress	40,000	900	31.1	
1990	3 rubles	World Summit for Children	Emblem	20,000	900	31.1	
1991	3 rubles	500th anniv. of Russian State	Bolshoi Theatre	25,000	900	31.1	
1991	3 rubles	250th anniv. of the discovery of Russian America	James Cook at Unalaska	25,000	900	31.1	
1991	3 rubles	500th anniv. of Russian State	Triumphal Arch of Moscow	40,000	900	31.1	
1991	3 rubles	250th anniv. of the discovery of Russian America	Fort Ross	25,000	900	31.1	
1991	3 rubles	30th anniv. of the first human flight into space (USSR citizen Yuri Gagarin)	Monument on Leninsky Avenue in Moscow, stars in the background, dates: "1961", "1991", Russian text "30 ЛЕТ ПЕРВОГО ПОЛЕТА ЧЕЛОВЕКА КОСМОС" (30 years of human spaceflight)	25,000	900	31.1	
1977	5 rubles	Games of the 22nd Olympiad in Moscow	Leningrad: Admiralty building, Smolny and monument to Vladimir Lenin, Winter Palace, Rostral column	250,411 unc. + 121,417 proof	900		
1977	5 rubles	Games of the 22nd Olympiad in Moscow	Tallinn	251,562 unc. + 122,167 proof	900		
1977	5 rubles	Games of the 22nd Olympiad in Moscow	Kiev: monument in the Park of Eternal Glory, "Druzhba" skyscraper on Khreshchatyk, building of the Supreme Soviet of the Ukrainian SSR	250,037 unc. + 121,137 proof	900		
1977	5 rubles	Games of the 22nd Olympiad in Moscow	Minsk: Victory Square, Minsk Sports Palace	250,040 unc. + 121,137 proof	900		
1978	5 rubles	Games of the 22nd Olympiad in Moscow	swimming: butterfly swimmer, Swimming Pool at the Olimpiysky Sports Complex in the background	226,665 unc. + 118,335 proof	900		
1978	5 rubles	Games of the 22nd Olympiad in Moscow	Running: runner, stadium in the background	226,653 unc. + 118,353 proof	900		
1978	5 rubles	Games of the 22nd Olympiad in Moscow	equestrian	220,603 unc. + 118,409 proof	900		
1978	5 rubles	Games of the 22nd Olympiad in Moscow	high jump	220,583 unc. + 119,143 proof	900		
1979	5 rubles	Games of the 22nd Olympiad in Moscow	hammer throw	207,078 unc. + 107,928 proof	900		
1979	5 rubles	Games of the 22nd Olympiad in Moscow	weightlifting: athlete after an overhead split jerk, Izmailovo Palace of Sports	207,078 unc. + 107,928 proof	900		
1980	5 rubles	Games of the 22nd Olympiad in Moscow	gymnastics:gymnast doing stag handstand on the beam, Palace of Sports of the Central Lenin Stadium	126,220 unc. + 95,420 proof	900		
1980	5 rubles	Games of the 22nd Olympiad in Moscow	archery	126,220 unc. + 95,420 proof	900		
1980	5 rubles	Games of the 22nd Olympiad in Moscow	folk sport Gorodki: player throwing a bat; gorodki figures (fork, well, cannon, lobster, watchmen, machine gun installation)	126,220 unc. + 95,420 proof	900		
1980	5 rubles	Games of the 22nd Olympiad in Moscow	folk sport "Isindi": two horsemen during the pursuit, one of them throws a javelin into another	126,220 unc. + 95,420 proof	900		
1977	10 rubles	Games of the 22nd Olympiad in Moscow	Moscow: Moscow Kremlin	250,414 unc. + 121,423 proof	900		
1977	10 rubles	Games of the 22nd Olympiad in Moscow	Map of the USSR	250,040 unc. + 121,137 proof	900		
1978	10 rubles	Games of the 22nd Olympiad in Moscow	cycling	226,504 unc. + 118,353 proof	900		
1978	10 rubles	Games of the 22nd Olympiad in Moscow	rowing	226,404 unc. + 118,403 proof	900		
1978	10 rubles	Games of the 22nd Olympiad in Moscow	folk sport "Overtake a girl": a horseman and a horsewoman during the pursuit	226,404 unc. + 118,403 proof	900		
1978	10 rubles	Games of the 22nd Olympiad in Moscow	pole vault	220,583 unc. + 119,343 proof	900		
1979	10 rubles	Games of the 22nd Olympiad in Moscow	basketball	220,583 unc. + 119,243 proof	900		
1979	10 rubles	Games of the 22nd Olympiad in Moscow	volleyball: players in action (an attack and a block), Minor Arena of the Central Lenin Stadium	220,583 unc. + 119,243 proof	900		
1979	10 rubles	Games of the 22nd Olympiad in Moscow	judo: fighting judoka, Palace of Sports of the Central Lenin Stadium	207,078 unc. + 107,928 proof	900		
1979	10 rubles	Games of the 22nd Olympiad in Moscow	boxing: boxers during the fight, Indoor Stadium of the Olympiski Sports Complex in the background	207,078 unc. + 107,928 proof	900		
1979	10 rubles	Games of the 22nd Olympiad in Moscow	folk sport "Kettlebell lifting": athlete in action	207,078 unc. + 107,928 proof	900		
1980	10 rubles	Games of the 22nd Olympiad in Moscow	folk sport "Dance of an eagle and khuresh": fighting wrestlers, winner performing "dance of an eagle"	126,220 unc. + 95,420 proof	900		
1980	10 rubles	Games of the 22nd Olympiad in Moscow	folk sport "Tug of war": two teams during the competition	126,220 unc. + 95,420 proof	900		
1980	10 rubles	Games of the 22nd Olympiad in Moscow	folk sport "Reindeer race"	126,220 unc. + 95,420 proof	900		

== Gold coins ==
Year	Denomination	Commemorative subject	Reverse	Mintage	mf	weight (g)	Image
1991	10 rubles	Russian Ballet	Bolshoi Theatre	6,000	585	2.65	
1991	25 rubles	Russian Ballet	Bolshoi Theatre	5,000	585	5.32	
1991	25 rubles	Russian Ballet Proof	Bolshoi Theatre	1,500	999	3.11	
1988	50 rubles	1000th anniv. of ancient Russian architecture	Saint Sophia Cathedral in Novgorod	25,000	900	8.75	
1989	50 rubles	500th anniv. of Russian State	Cathedral of the Dormition	25,000	900	8.75	
1990	50 rubles	500th anniv. of Russian State	Gabriel the Archangel Church	25,000	900	8.75	
1991	50 rubles	500th anniv. of Russian State	Saint Isaac's Cathedral	25,000	900	8.75	
1991	50 rubles	Russian Ballet	Bolshoi Theatre	2,400	585	13.3	
1991	50 rubles	Russian Ballet Proof	Bolshoi Theatre	1,500	999	7.78	
1977	100 rubles	Games of the 22nd Olympiad in Moscow	Emblem	81,752 (38,036 of them proof); MMD & LMD	900	17.45	
1978	100 rubles	Games of the 22nd Olympiad in Moscow	Central Lenin Stadium	107,340 (45,317 proof); MMD & LMD	900	17.45	
1978	100 rubles	Games of the 22nd Olympiad in Moscow	Man-made Basin for rowing events	100,406 (43,253 proof); MMD & LMD	900	17.45	
1979	100 rubles	Games of the 22nd Olympiad in Moscow	Velodrome	97,126 (42,213 proof); MMD & LMD	900	17.45	
1979	100 rubles	Games of the 22nd Olympiad in Moscow	Druzhba (Friendship) Multi-Purpose Arena	91,506 (38,003 proof); MMD	900	17.45	
1980	100 rubles	Games of the 22nd Olympiad in Moscow	Olympic flame	52,440 (27,820 proof); MMD	900	17.45	
1988	100 rubles	1000th anniv. of ancient Russian Mintage	Vladimir's Zlatnik	14,000	900	17.45	
1989	100 rubles	500th anniv. of Russian State	State seal of Ivan III	14,000	900	17.45	
1990	100 rubles	500th anniv. of Russian State	Monument to Peter the Great	14,000	900	17.45	
1991	100 rubles	500th anniv. of Russian State	Leo Tolstoy	14,000	900	17.45	
1991	100 rubles	Russian Ballet	Bolshoi Theatre	1,200	585	26.58	
1991	100 rubles	Russian Ballet Proof	Bolshoi Theatre	1,500	999	15.55	

== Platinum coins ==
Year	Denomination	Commemorative subject	Reverse	Mintage	mf	weight (g)	Image
1977	150 rubles	Games of the 22nd Olympiad in Moscow	Emblem	34,070 (24,160 of them proof)	999	15.55	
1978	150 rubles	Games of the 22nd Olympiad in Moscow	Discobolus	33,256 (19,853 proof)	999	15.55	
1979	150 rubles	Games of the 22nd Olympiad in Moscow	wrestlers	32,556 (18,978 proof)	999	15.55	
1980	150 rubles	Games of the 22nd Olympiad in Moscow	chariot	26,806 (17,708 proof)	999	15.55	
1980	150 rubles	Games of the 22nd Olympiad in Moscow	runners	20,690 (12,870 proof)	999	15.55	
1988	150 rubles	1000th anniv. of ancient Russian literature	The Tale of Igor's Campaign	12,000	999	15.55	
1989	150 rubles	500th anniv. of Russian State	Great standing on the Ugra river	16,000	999	15.55	
1990	150 rubles	500th anniv. of Russian State	Battle of Poltava	16,000	999	15.55	
1990	150 rubles	250th anniv. of the discovery of Russian America	vessel Saint Gabriel	6,500	999	15.55	
1991	150 rubles	500th Anniversary of Russian State (Patriotic War of 1812)		16,000	999	15.55	
1991	150 rubles	250th anniv. of the discovery of Russian America	Ioann Veniaminov	6,500	999	15.55	

== Palladium coins ==
Year	Denomination	Commemorative subject	Reverse	Mintage	mf	weight (g)	Image
1991	5 rubles	Russian ballet	ballerina in the role of Odette	9,000	999	7.87	
1990	10 rubles	Russian ballet	ballerina in the role of Odette	1,400	999	15.55	
1991	10 rubles	Russian ballet	ballerina in the role of Odette	8,000	999	15.55	
1988	25 rubles	1000th anniv. of the Baptism of Russia	Monument to the duke Vladimir Svyatoslavich	7,000	999	31.1	
1989	25 rubles	500th Anniversary of Russian State	Ivan III	12,000	999	31.1	
1989	25 rubles	Russian ballet	ballerina in the role of Odette	6,500	999	31.1	
1990	25 rubles	500th Anniversary of Russian State	Peter the Great	12,000	999	31.1	
1990	25 rubles	250th anniv. of the discovery of Russian America	vessel St. Peter	6,500	999	31.1	
1990	25 rubles	250th anniv. of the discovery of Russian America	vessel St. Paul	6,500	999	31.1	
1990	25 rubles	Russian ballet	ballerina in the role of Odette	24,000	999	31.1	
1991	25 rubles	500th Anniversary of Russian State	Serfdom abolition	12,000	999	31.1	
1991	25 rubles	250th anniv. of the discovery of Russian America	Three Saints Bay	6,500	999	31.1	
1991	25 rubles	250th anniv. of the discovery of Russian America	Novo-Arkhangelsk	6,500	999	31.1	
1991	25 rubles	Russian ballet	ballerina in the role of Odette	3,000	999	31.1	

== References and sources ==
Books

- Bruce, Colin R. II (2008). 2009 Standard Catalog of World Coins: 1901–2000 (36th ed.). Krause Publications. pp. 1726–1742. ISBN 978-0-89689-630-7.

Websites

- Money of Russia - photos of Soviet commemorative gold, platinum and palladium coins
- USSR Silver Coins – with photos and descriptions
- The Mint – detailed descriptions and photos of 1965–1996 Soviet and Russian commemorative copper-nickel coins
