= Monument to the Conquerors of Space =

Monument in Moscow, Russia

- Монуме́нт «Покори́телям ко́смоса»
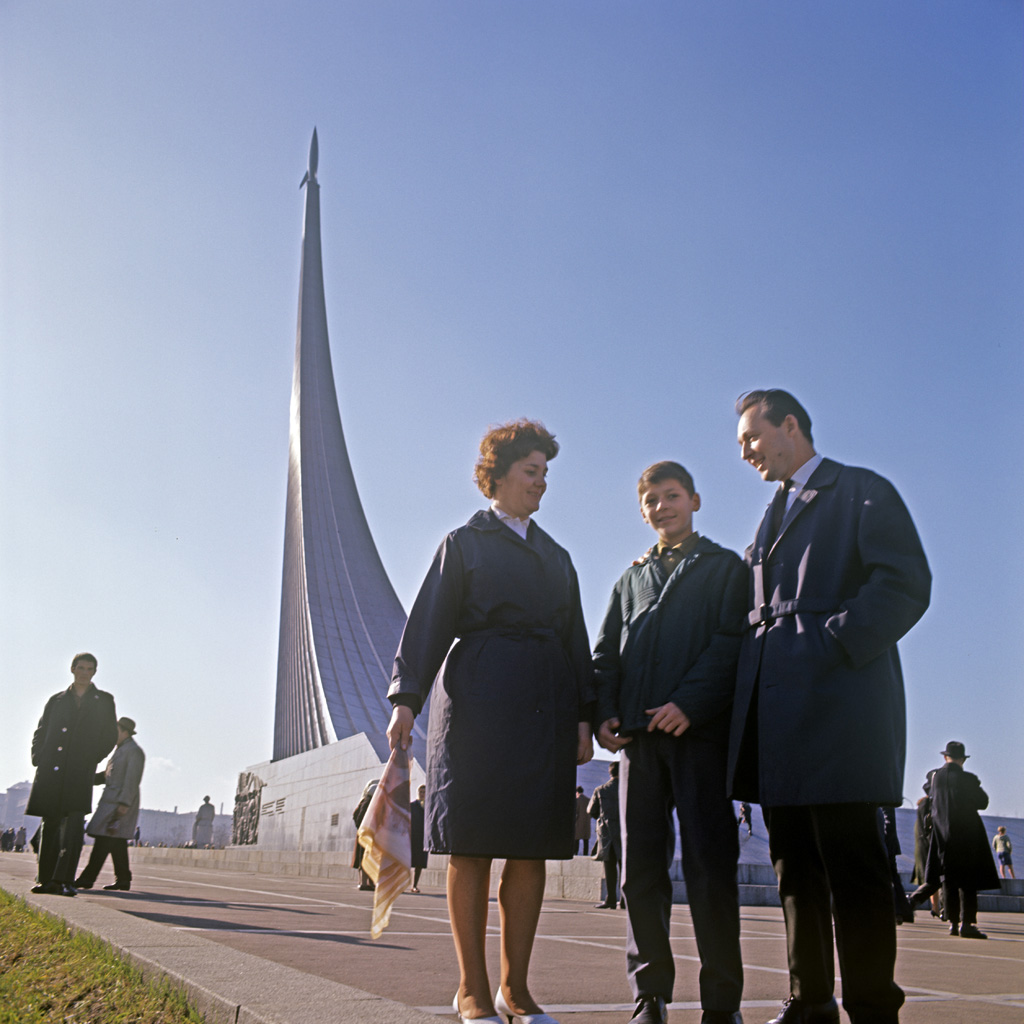
- The monument seen from Cosmonauts Alley in 1967
- Interactive map of Monument to the Conquerors of Space
- Location: Moscow, Russia
- Coordinates: 55°49′22″N 37°38′24″E
- Opening date: 1964

The Monument to the Conquerors of Space (Russian: Монуме́нт «Покори́телям ко́смоса», romanized: Monumént "Pokorítelyam kósmosa", IPA: [mənʊˈmʲent pəkɐˈrʲitʲɪlʲɪm ˈkosməsə]) is a giant obelisk in Moscow built in 1964 to celebrate achievements of the Soviet people in space exploration. It depicts a starting rocket that rises on its exhaust plume.

The monument is 107 meters (351 feet) tall, has 77° incline, and is made of titanium. The Memorial Museum of Cosmonautics is located inside the base of the monument.

== Location and surroundings ==
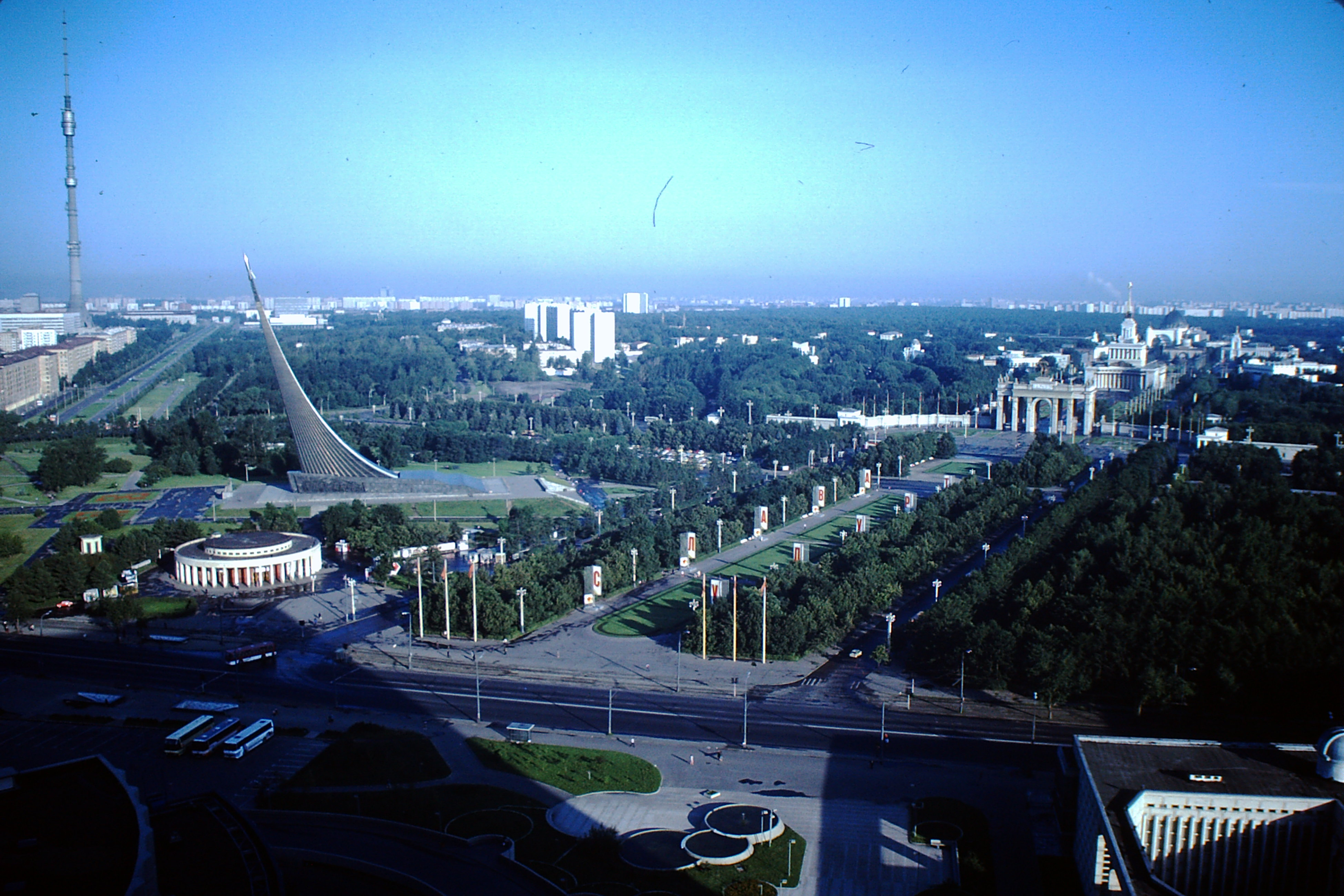
The monument in context of the space exhibition, in the background to the left is the Ostankino Tower (1984)

The monument is located outside the main entry to today's Exhibition of Achievements of the National Economy (VDNKh), in the northeastern part of Moscow, near Prospekt Mira ("Peace Avenue"). The easiest access is from the VDNKh subway station.

Since the 1960s, this part of Moscow in general has had a high concentration of space-themed sights and names: besides the monument and the museum under it, the grand "Cosmos" pavilion in the Exhibition Centre displayed many artifacts of the Soviet space program. Many streets in the area have been named after the precursors of the space program (Nikolai Kibalchich, Friedrich Zander, Yuri Kondratyuk) and its participants (Sergey Korolyov).

The Cosmonauts Alley south of the monument features busts of Soviet cosmonauts.

The choice of this part of Moscow for space-related names and monuments may have been inspired by the fact that Prospekt Mira runs toward the north-eastern suburbs of Moscow, where, in Podlipki (today's Korolyov City) much of the space program was based. Korolyov himself lived in a house within a few blocks from the monument, which is now preserved as the Korolyov Memorial Museum (Russian: Дом-музей академика С. П. Королёва).

Sculptures along the square infront of the monument

Path to the square infront of the monument

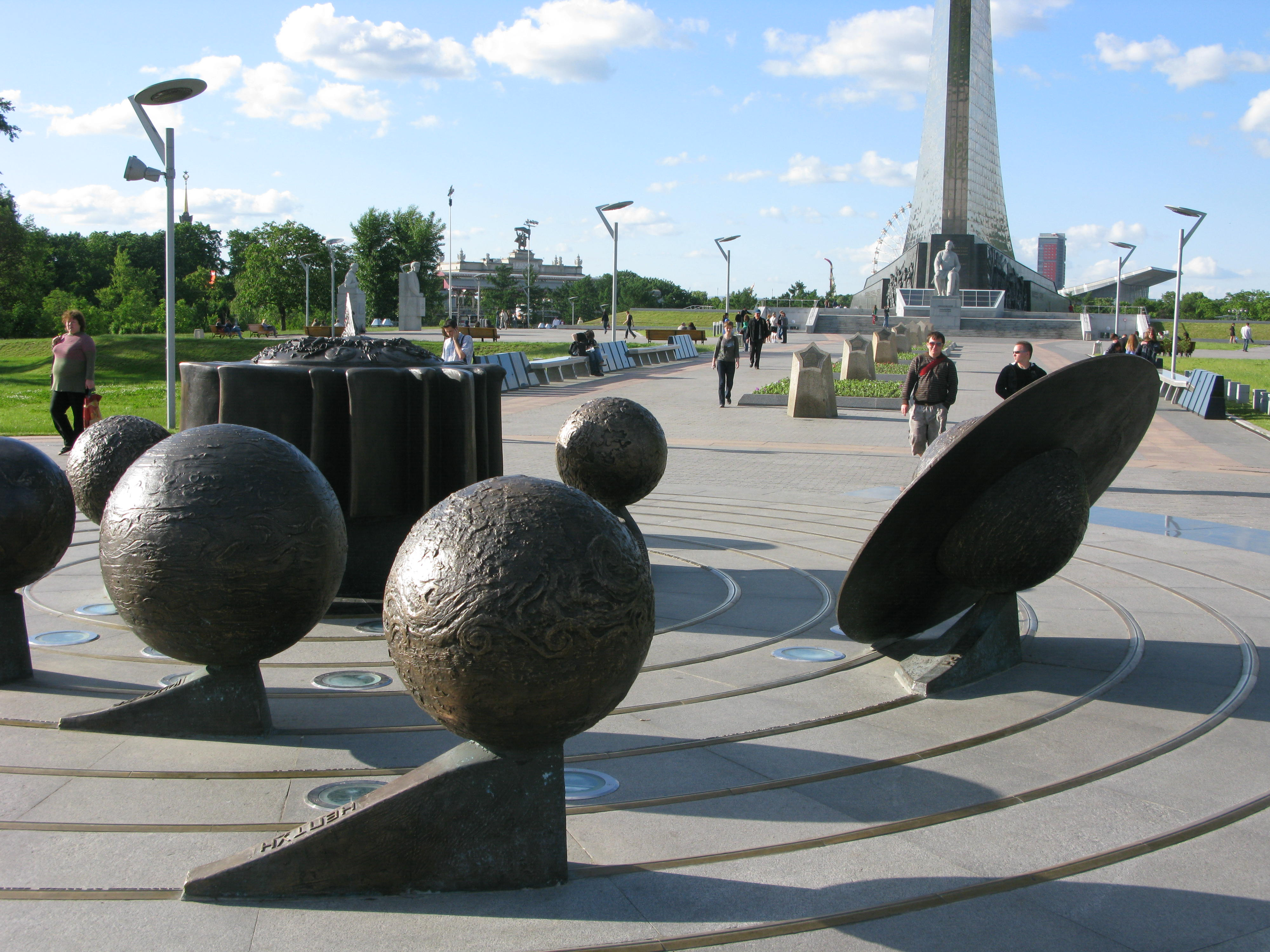
Solar System model on the path next to the Sergei Korolev statue

Korolev statue

Mound

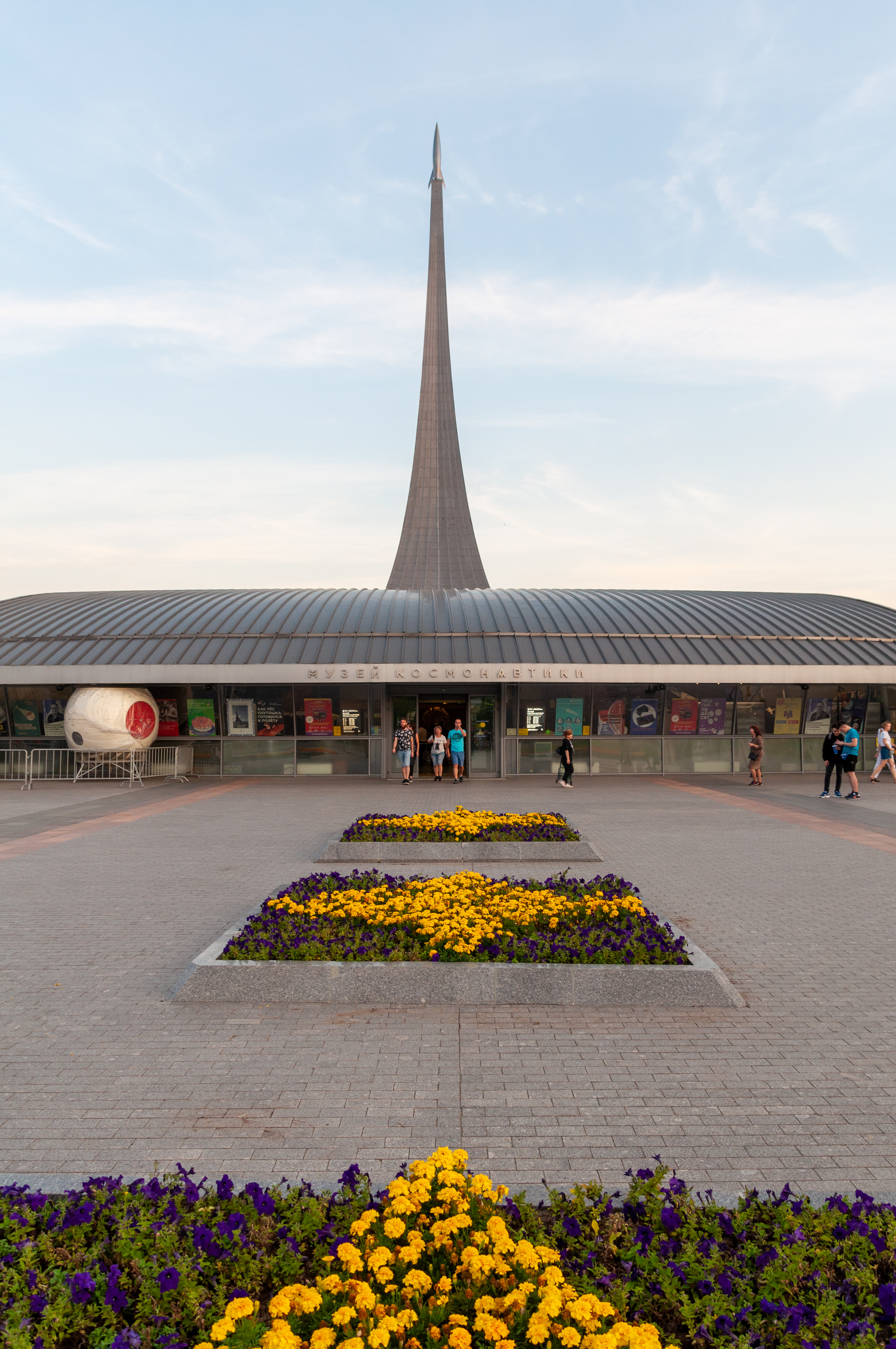
Entrance at the base

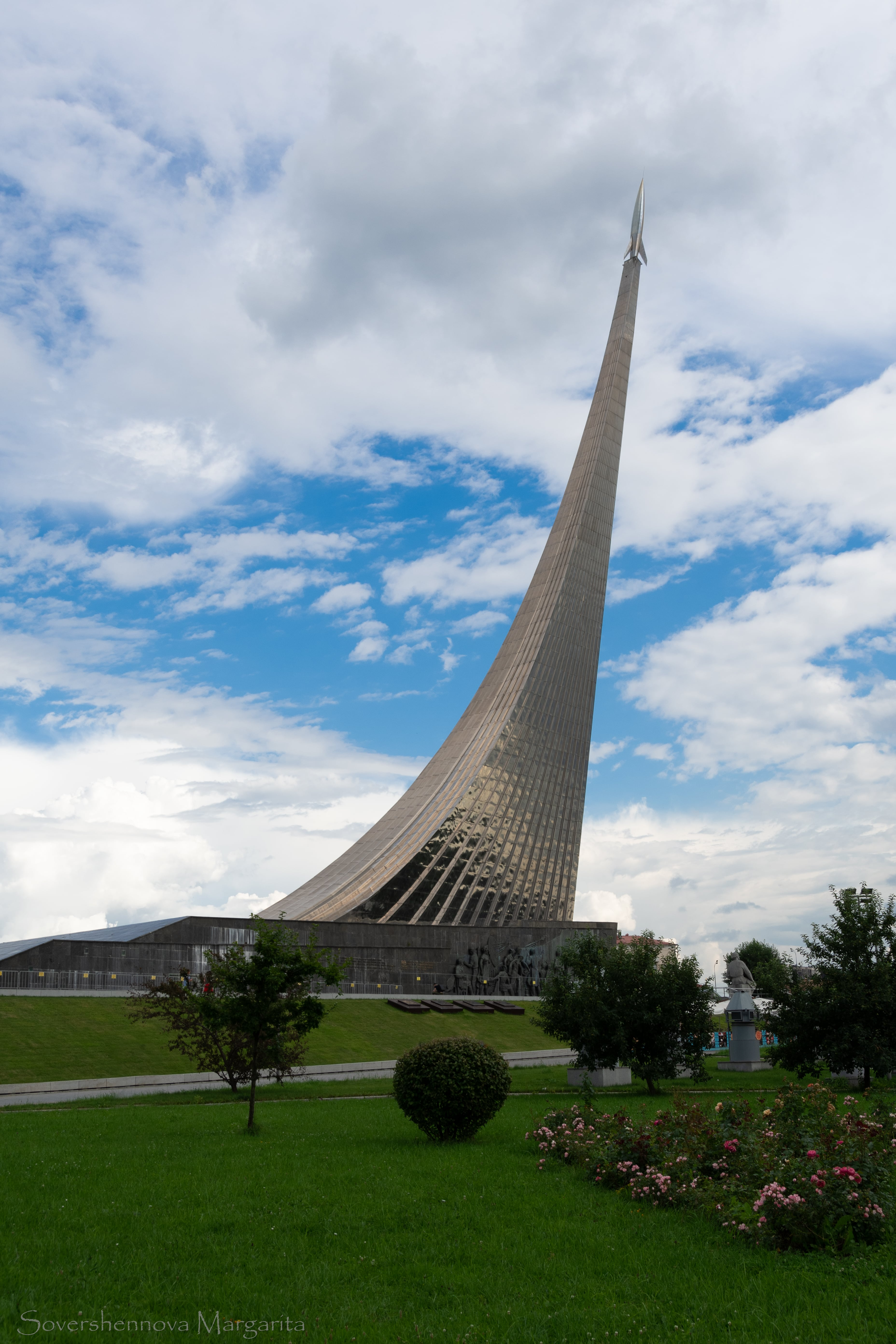
View from the surrounding park

At night

== History ==
Photo from the opening of the monument 1964

In March 1958, a few months after the launch of Sputnik 1, a competition was announced for the best design of an obelisk celebrating the dawn of the Space Age. Out of some 350 proposals, the design by sculptor A.P. Faidysh-Krandievsky and architects A.N. Kolchin and M.O. Barshch was chosen. The grand opening of the monument took place on October 4, 1964, on the day of the 7th anniversary of the Sputnik 1 launch.

The monument was designed to accommodate a museum in its base. However, it took until April 10, 1981 (two days before the 20th anniversary of Yuri Gagarin's flight) to complete the preparatory work and open the Memorial Museum of Cosmonautics. The museum reopened on April 12, 2009, after three years of renovations.

== Design and sculpture ==
The main part of the monument is a giant obelisk topped by a rocket and resembling in shape the exhaust plume of the rocket. It is 107 meters (350 feet) tall and, on Korolyov's suggestion, covered with titanium cladding. A statue of Konstantin Tsiolkovsky, the precursor of astronautics, is located in front of the obelisk.

Both sides of the monument base, in their front parts, are decorated with haut- and bas-reliefs depicting men and women of the space program: scientists, engineers, workers, their occupations indicated by appropriate accoutrements of the professions. Notable figures include a computer programmer (or perhaps some other computing or telecommunications professional) holding a punched tape, a cosmonaut wearing a space suit, and Laika the space dog, first living creature to orbit Earth.

No contemporary Soviet politicians are depicted in the monument (that would violate the convention existing in the post-Joseph Stalin Soviet Union against commemorating living persons in this fashion), but the crowd on the right side of the monument are moving forward under the banner of Vladimir Lenin.

Statue of Konstantin Tsiolkovsky infront of the monument at its base

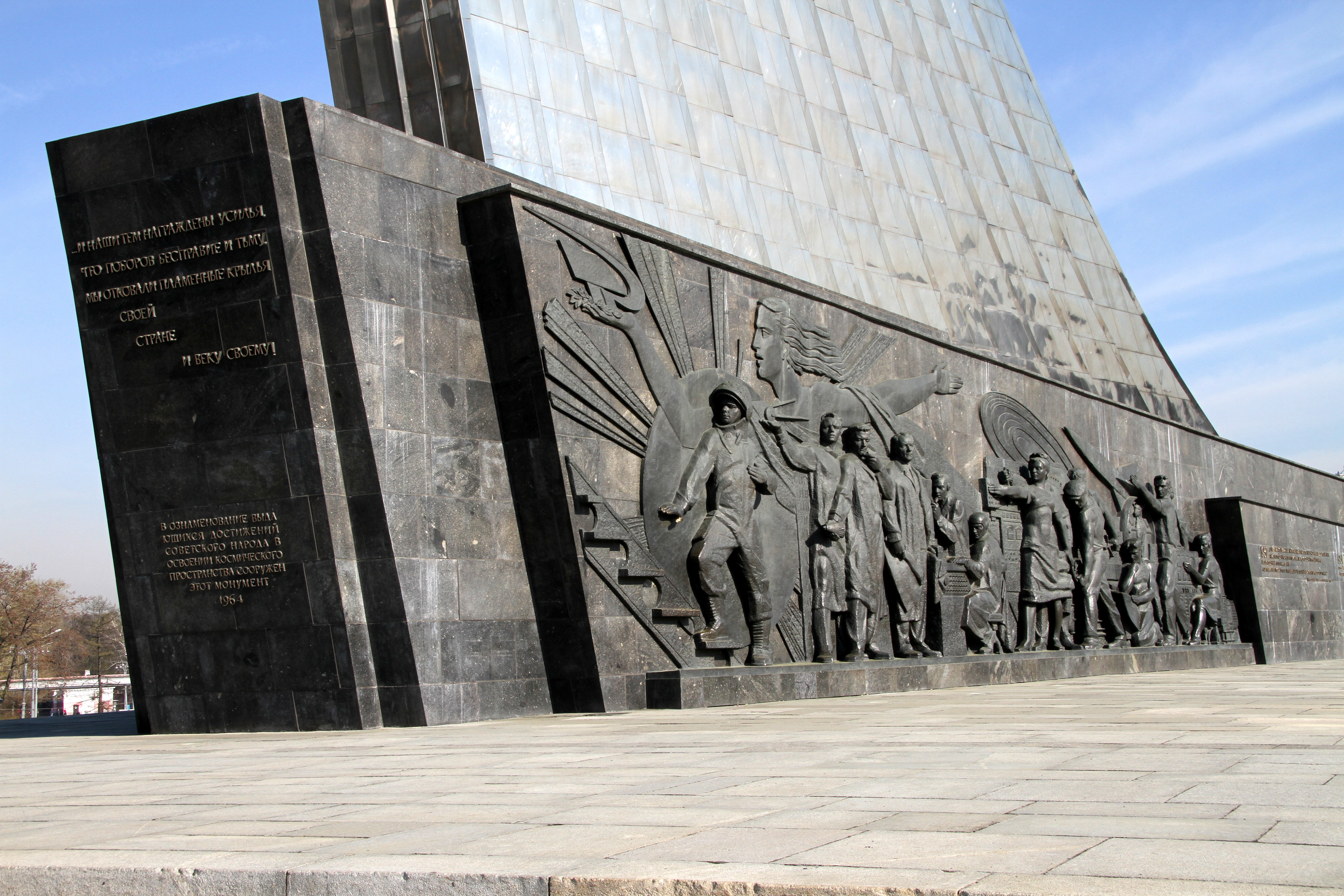
Eastern side of the base

Western side of the base

== The monument reflected in other media ==
The Monument to the Conquerors of Space is featured on the 1967 10 kopeck piece, one of the series of the commemorative coins issued to celebrate the 50th anniversary of the October Revolution. This coin has the distinction of being the smallest-denomination commemorative coin ever minted in the Soviet Union. (It was the smallest coin in the 1967 series—the only time commemorative fractional currency coins were ever produced in the USSR. All later commemorative coins were either 1 rouble, or a higher denomination).

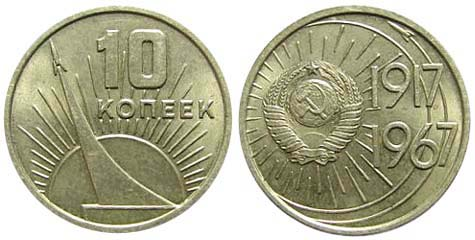
10 kopeck anniversary coin celebrating 50 years of the October Revolution (1967)

Stamp with Sergei Korolev

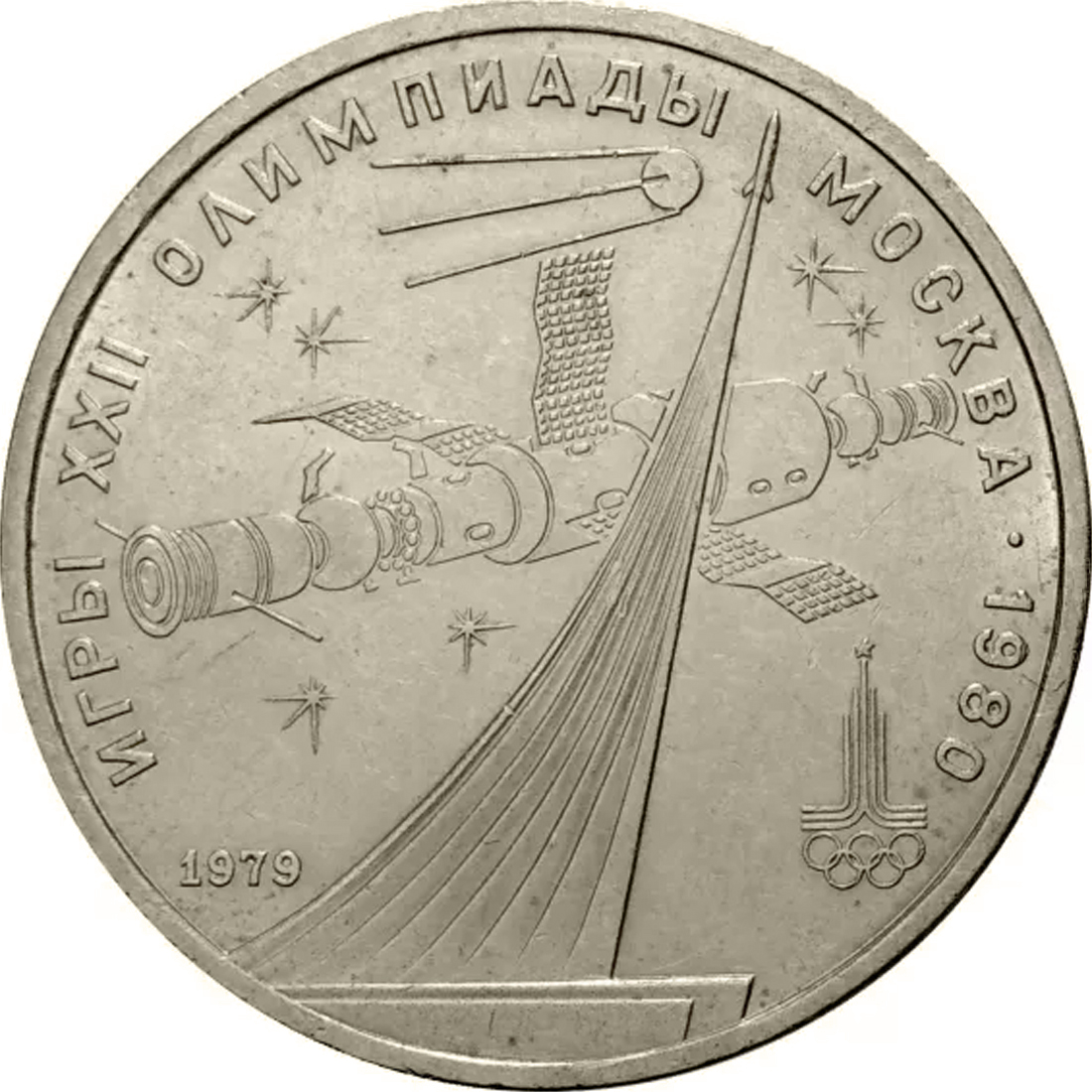
1 Ruble coin (1979)

The Monument is featured in the 1993 music video "Go West" by Pet Shop Boys.

Also monument featured in the music video "Sweet Lullaby" by Deep Forest.

The monument was depicted on the home kit for the Russia national football team for the 2014 FIFA World Cup on the front of the shirts in different shades of maroon.

The monument also featured on the back page of the 1964, no. 11, Soviet Woman.

== Replicas ==
The monument to Konstantin Tsiolkovsky in downtown Borovsk, designed by Sergey Bychkov, contains a nearly exact scale replica of the Conquerors of Space "rocket needle" and a whimsical statue of Tsiolkovsky gazing into the skies (and wearing valenki boots). It was unveiled in 2007. A copy of this statue (but not the "rocket needle") is installed at the Sir Thomas Brisbane Planetarium. A copy is also exhibited in the park of the United Nations Office in Geneva, a gift donated by the USSR and designed by the architect Alexander Koltchin and sculptor Yuri Neroda.

Replicas of the Monument to the Conquerors of Space
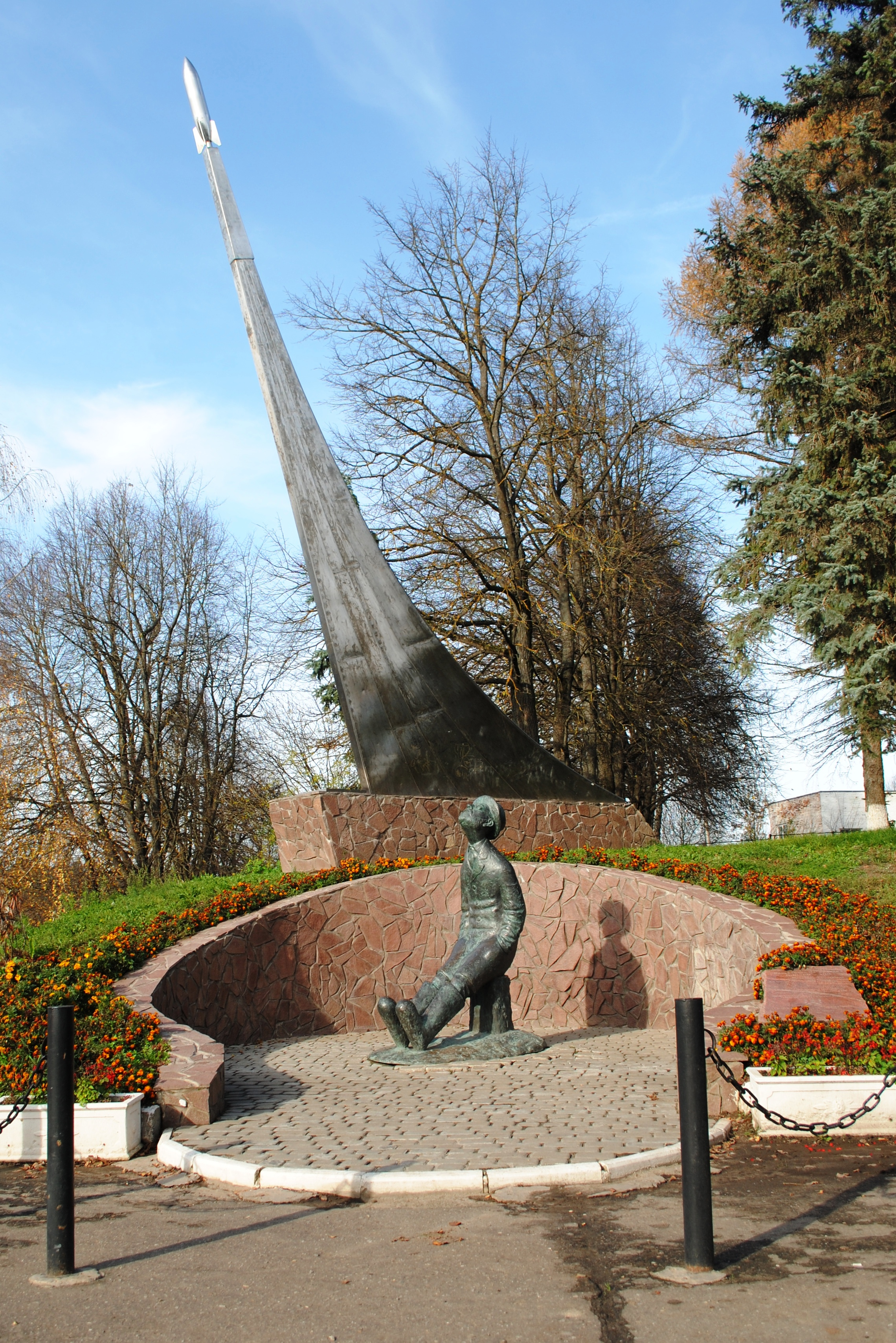
Tsiolkovsky monument in Borovsk

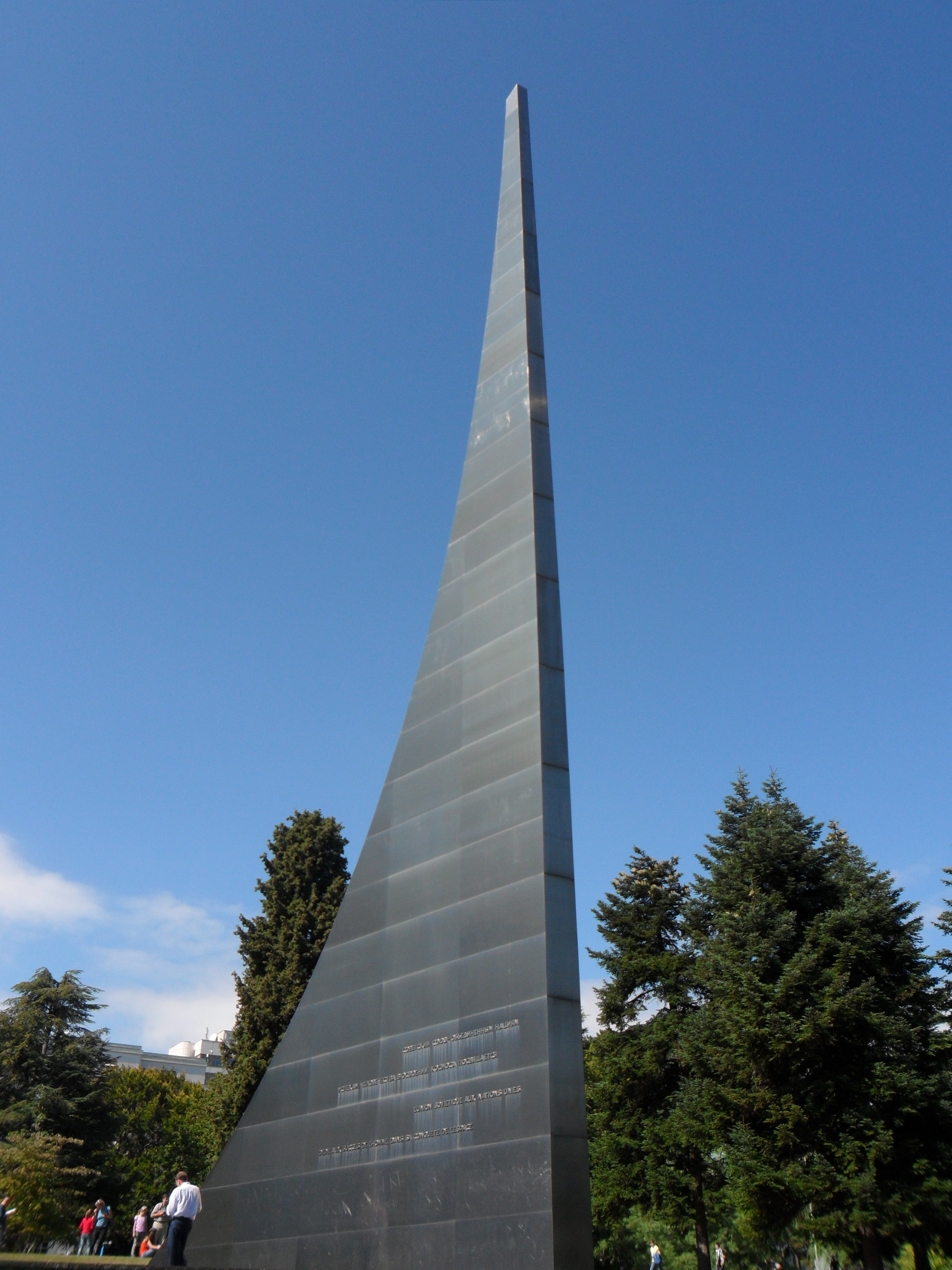
Conquest of Space in the Palace of Nations gardens in Geneva

== See also ==
- Memorial Museum of Cosmonautics
- Cosmonauts Alley
