= Cosmonauts Alley =

Avenue in Moscow, Russia

Coordinates: 55.82062°N 37.63933°E

Cosmonauts Alley аллея Космонавтов
- Pedestrian zone
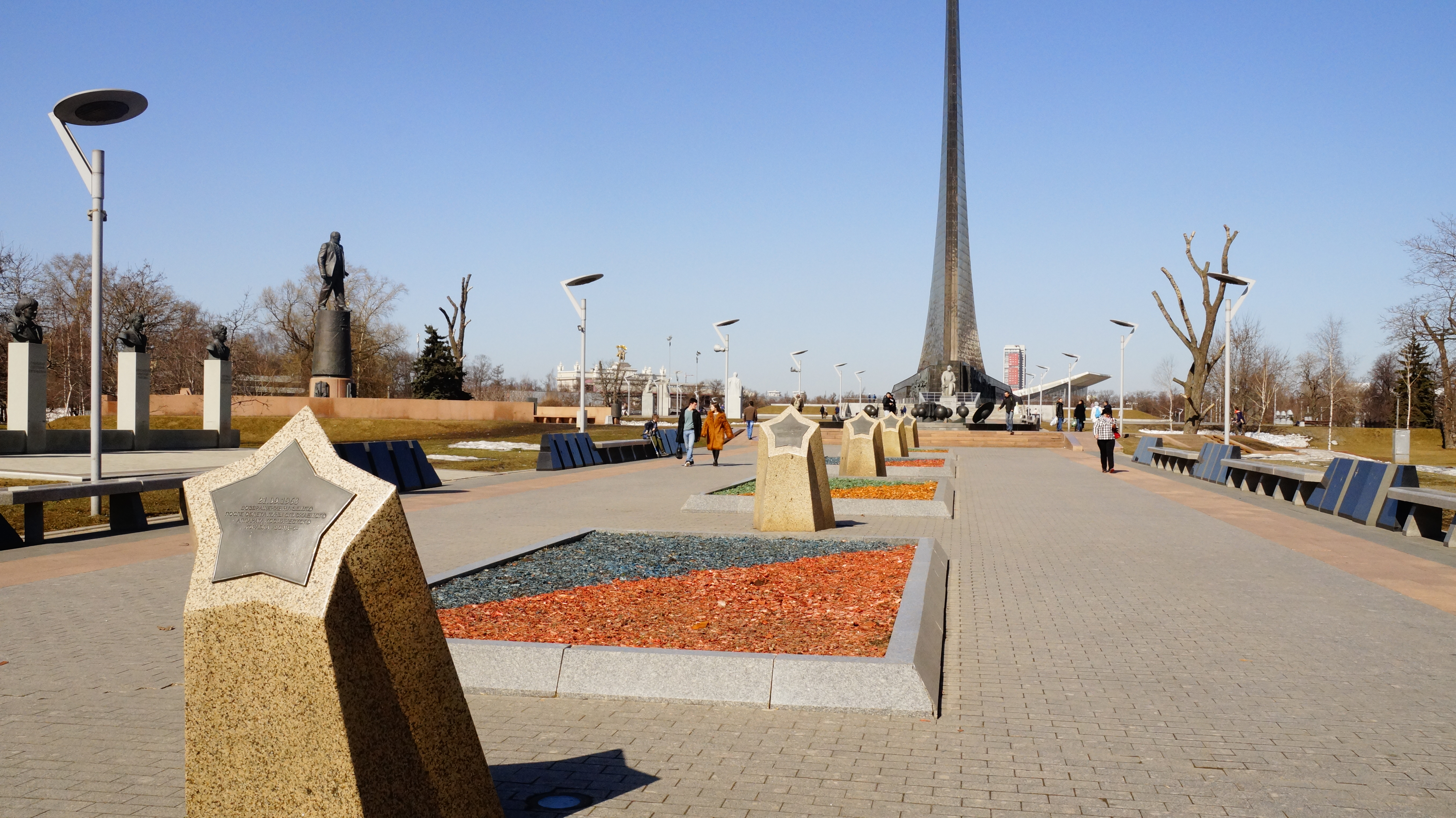
- Cosmonauts Alley (2018)
- Features: Monuments to individual cosmonauts, Memorial Museum of Cosmonautics, Monument to the Conquerors of Space, VDNKh subway station
- Design: Mikhail Barshch, Alexander Kolchin
- Opened: October 4, 1967
- Length: 250 metres (820 ft)
- Dedicated to: Soviet space program
- Interactive map of Cosmonauts Alley

Cosmonauts Alley (Russian: аллея Космонавтов) is a wide avenue in northern Moscow leading to the Russian Memorial Museum of Cosmonautics and the Monument to the Conquerors of Space. The pedestrian-only avenue connects the museum and monument to the VDNKh subway station.

== Monuments ==
- Yuri Gagarin
- Valentina Tereshkova
- Pavel Belyayev
- Alexei Leonov
- Vladimir Komarov
- Valentin Glushko
- Mstislav Keldysh
- Sergey Korolyov
- Konstantin Tsiolkovsky
- Valentin Lebedev
- Svetlana Savitskaya
- Alexander Alexandrov
- Vladimir Solovyov

== Gallery ==
Cosmonauts Alley on Cosmonautics Day (2002)

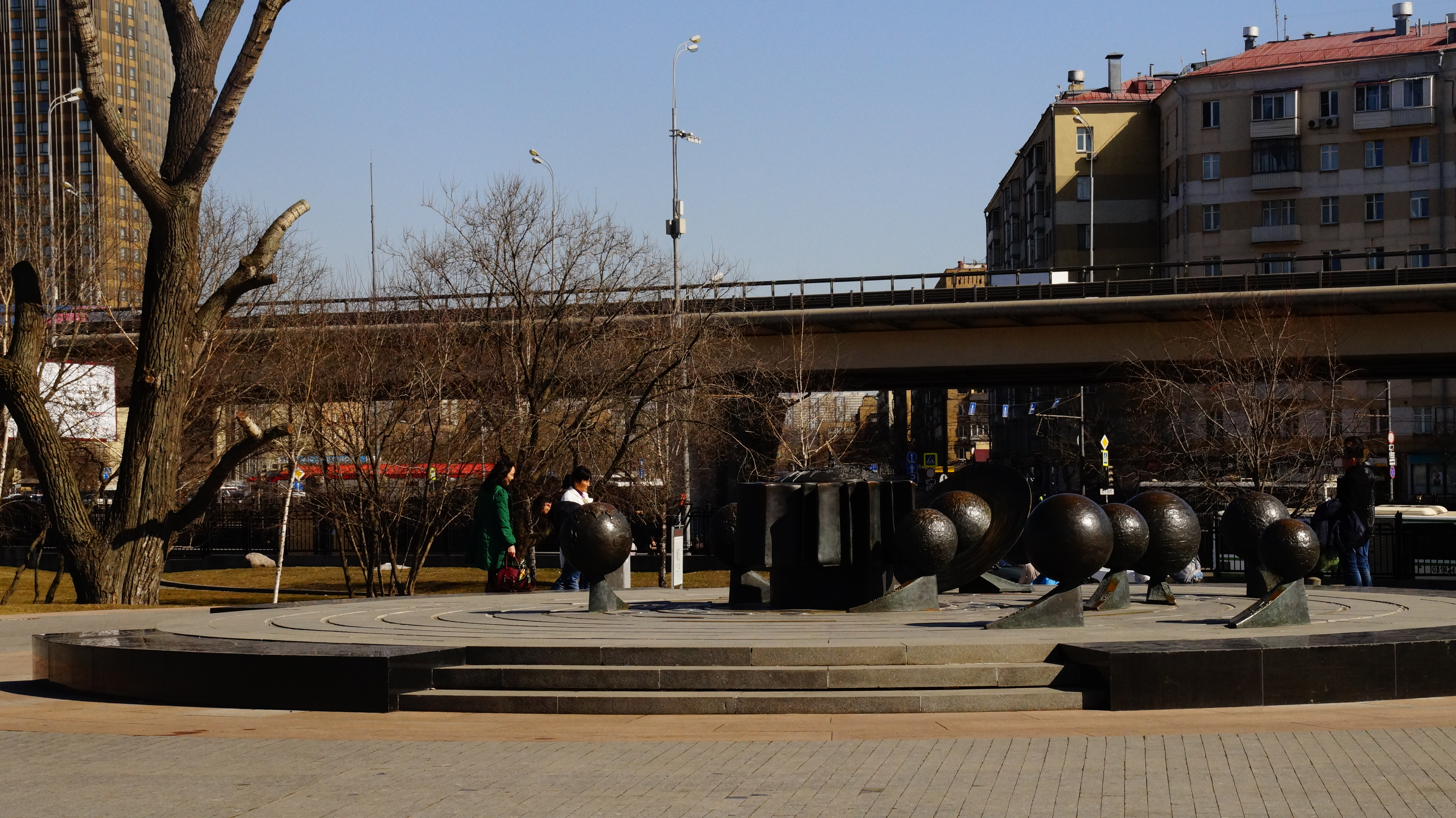
Model of the Solar System at the Cosmonauts Alley (Placed 2008)

== See also ==
- Soviet space program
- Sputnik 1
