= Guy Severin =

Soviet aerospace scientist (1926–2008)

- Гай Северин
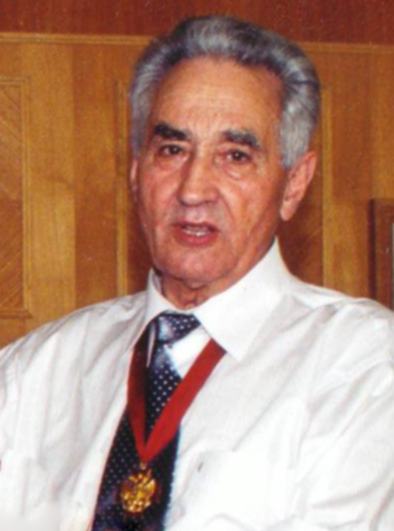
- 75th birthday in 2001
- Born: July 24, 1926; Chudovo, Leningrad Oblast, USSR
- Died: February 7, 2008 (aged 81); Tomilino, Moscow Oblast, Russia
- Citizenship: Soviet Union, then Russia
- Education: Moscow Aviation Institute (1949)
- Occupations: Scientist; engineer
- Years active: 1949–2008
- Employers: Flight Research Institute (1947-1964); NPP Zvezda (1964-2008)
- Title: Director and general designer of the NPP Zvezda; Doctor of Science; Professor
- Spouse: Tatiana V. Alekseeva (m. 1951)
- Children: 2
- Awards: Hero of Socialist Labour; Lenin Prize; USSR State Prize

Guy Ilyich Severin (Russian: Гай Ильи́ч Севери́н, Gay Ilyich Severin; July 24, 1926 – February 7, 2008) was a Soviet and Russian scientist, engineer, academician of the Russian Academy of Sciences, doctor of technical science, professor, full member of the International Academy of Astronautics, inventor and producer of a number of aerospace life-rescue systems and space suits.

== Life and works ==
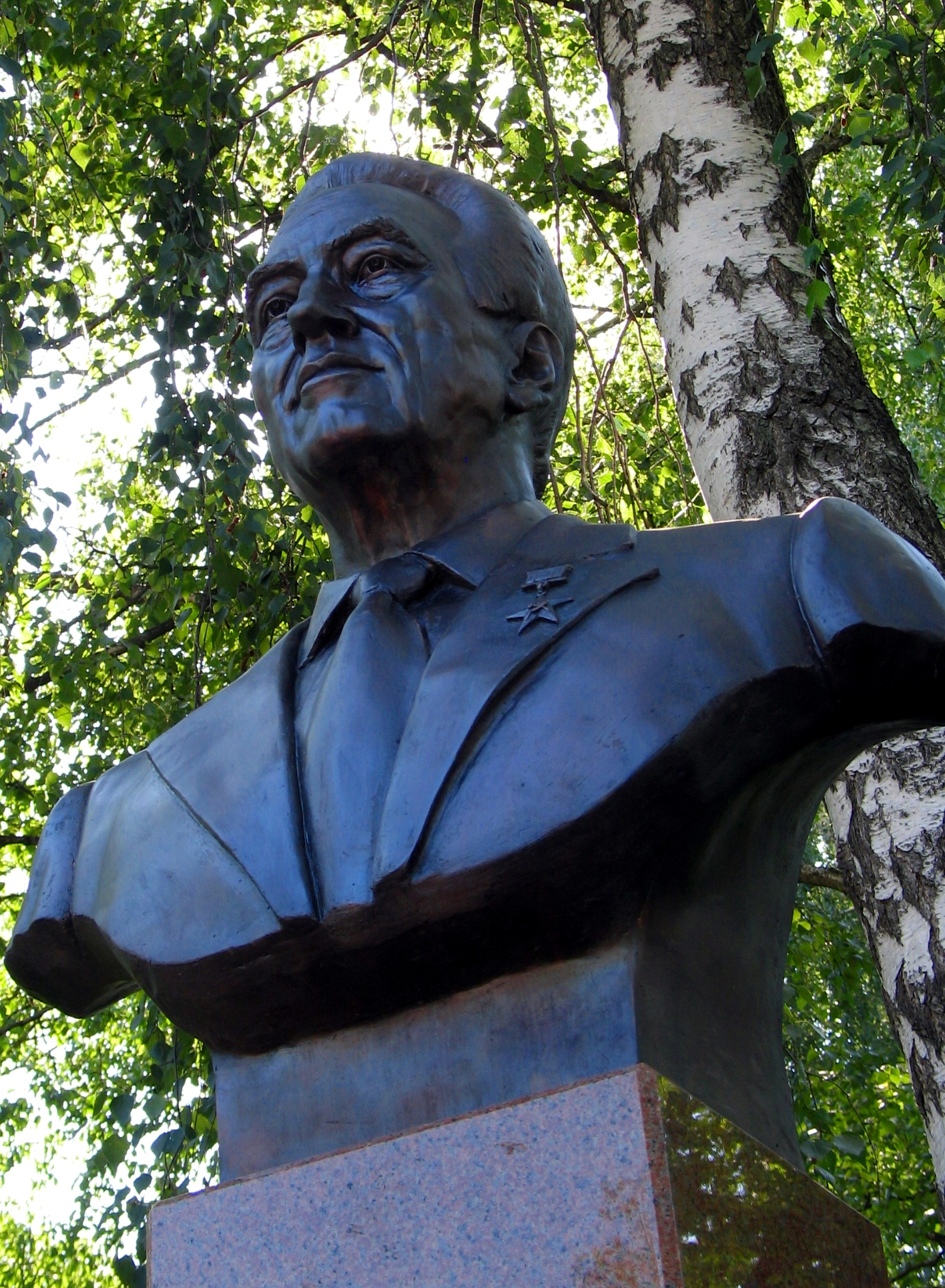
Bronze bust of Guy Severin

In 1949, he graduated from Moscow Aviation Institute (МАI). From 1947, Severin worked in Flight Research Institute in Zhukovsky, where he was occupied with research and flight test of the aircraft crew rescue and in-flight refuelling systems. A collective of engineers led by Severin worked out some major principles and working prototypes of landing systems and rocket emergency escape slides for Vostok spacecraft.

From 1964, Severin served as Chief Designer, General Designer and, eventually, General Director of the joint-stock company NPP Zvezda, located in Tomilino.

Under his direction, the company developed ejection seats (including well-known K-36), space suits, life support systems and rocket emergency escape slides for USSR/Russia aircraft, spacecraft and orbiting space stations (starting from Vostok 1 and the special inflatable EVA airlock of the Voskhod 2), an open space manoeuvring unit, etc.

He participated in preparations for Yuri Gagarin's and other Soviet cosmonauts space flights on Vostok, Voskhod and Soyuz spacecraft.

He was married and had two children. Two times wins USSR mountain skiing championship.

Died at a hospital after breaking both legs while skiing on a mountain ski lodge imitation near Moscow on February 7, 2008. The civil funeral was held at the House of Culture Zvezdniy in Tomilino on February 11, 2008. Present among the attendees was Boris Chertok, last remaining colleague of Sergei Korolev.

On July 24, 2008 a memorial to Severin was opened on the territory of the NPP Zvezda in Tomilino - a bronze bust. A number of local officials appeared for the opening ceremony.

== Awards and honors ==
- Order of the Red Banner of Labour (1957)
- Lenin Prize (1965)
- Three Orders of Lenin (1966, 1971, 1982)
- Order of the October Revolution (1971)
- USSR State Prize (1978)
- Hero of Socialist Labour (1982)
- Allan D. Emil Memorial Award (1991)
- Order of Friendship of Peoples (1992)
- Order "For Merit to the Fatherland", 3rd class (1996)
- State Prize of the Russian Federation (2001)
- Order "For Merit to the Fatherland", 2nd class (2007)

== Sources ==
- (in Russian) Space-suits of Russia by I.P.Abramov, M.N.Doodnik, V.I. Svershek, G.I.Severin, A.I.Skoog and A.Yu. Stoklitskiy, JSC NPP Zvezda, Moscow 2005, ISBN 5-7368-0285-6
- (in English) Russian Spacesuits (Springer Praxis Books / Space Exploration) by Isaac Abramov, Ingemar Skoog, Mikhail N. Doodnik, Anatoly Yu. Stoklitsky, Vitaly I. Svertshek and Guy I. Severin (Paperback, 366 pages - Aug 27, 2003), ISBN 1-85233-732-X
