= Orlan space suit =

Series of space suit models from Russia

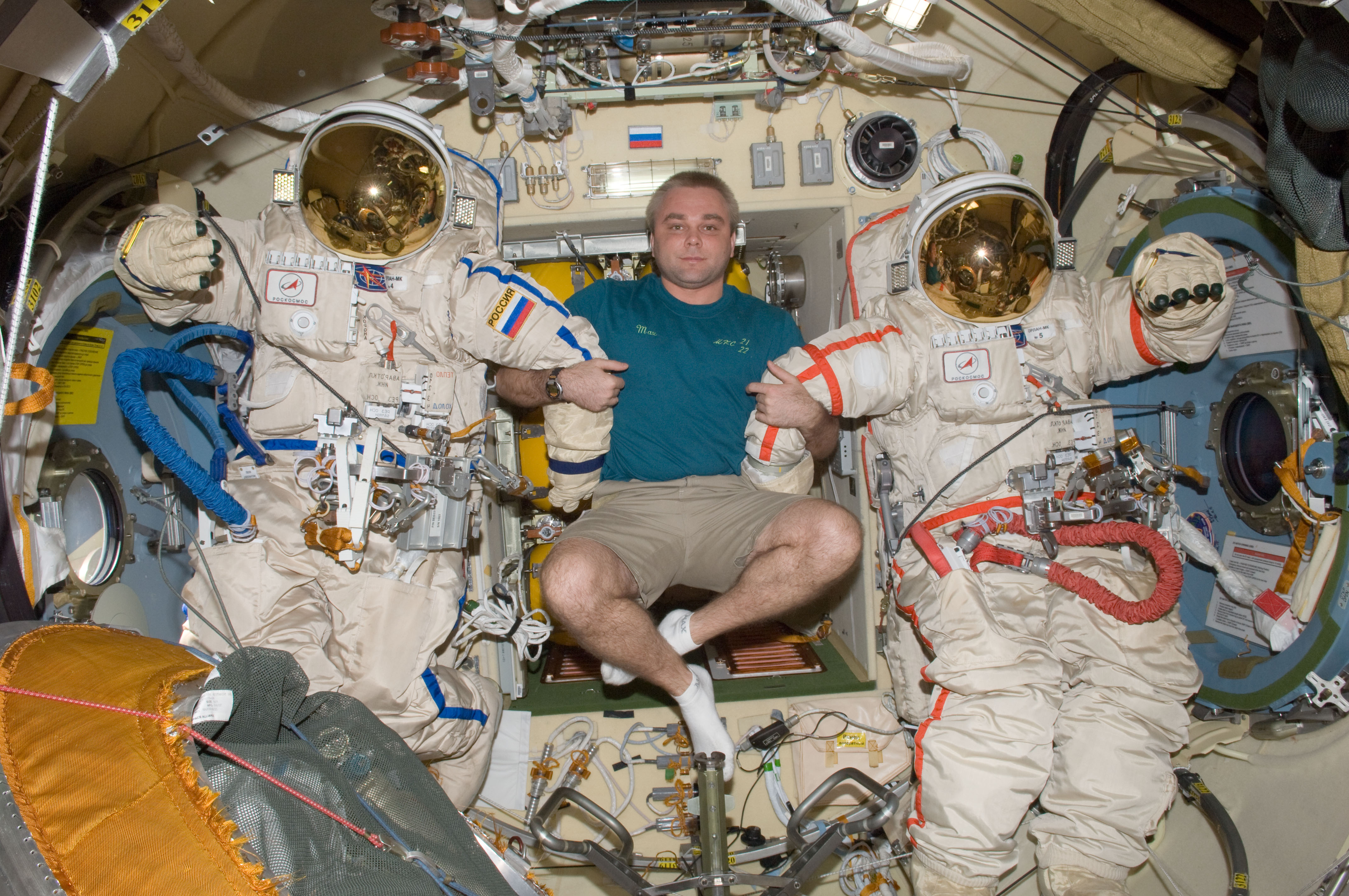
Cosmonaut Maksim Surayev next to two Orlan-MK models on the International Space Station

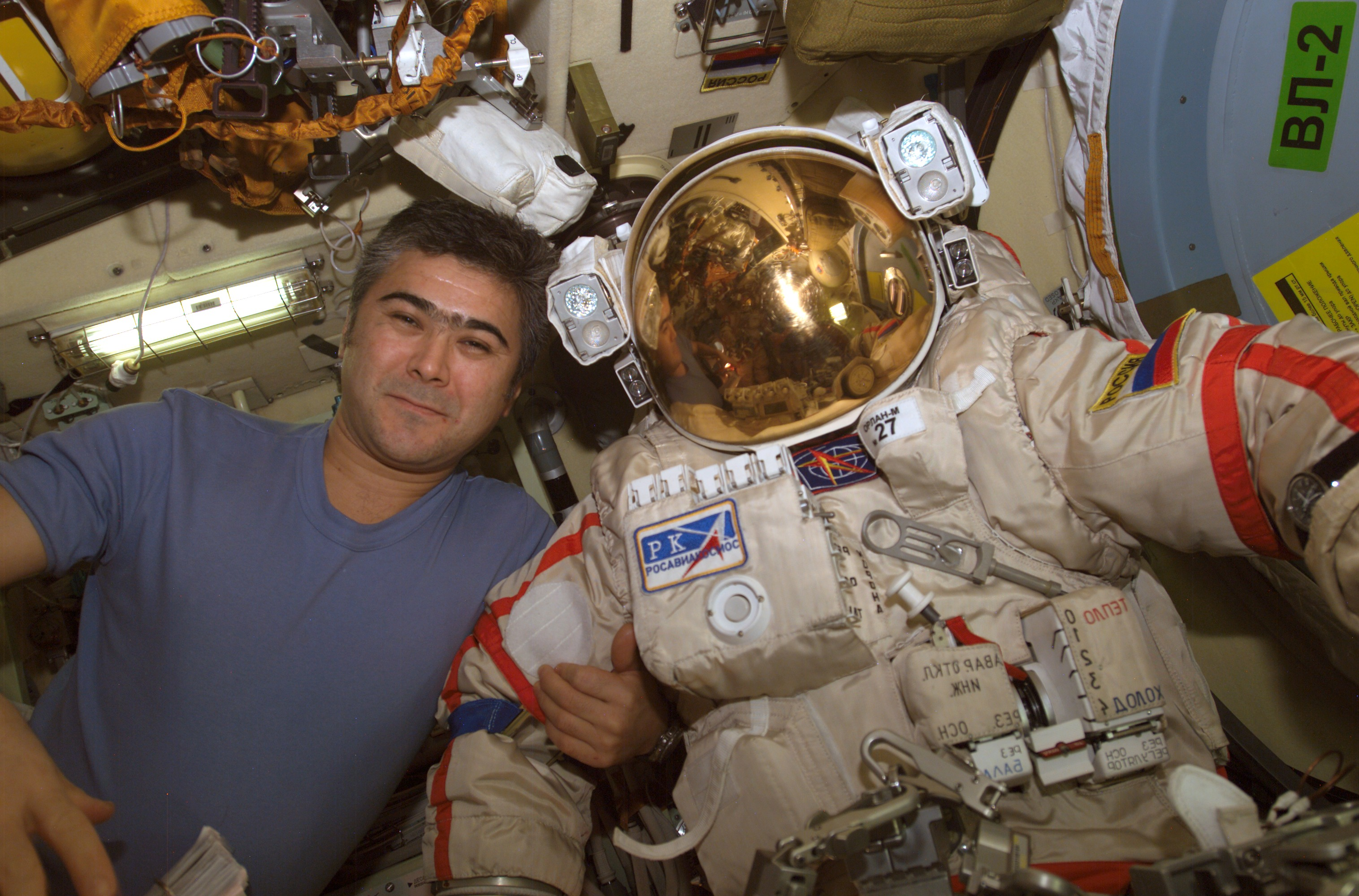
Cosmonaut Salizhan Sharipov, next to the Orlan-M spacesuit

The Orlan space suit (Russian: Орла́н, lit. 'sea eagle of the genus Haliaeetus') is a series of semi-rigid one-piece space-suit models designed and built by NPP Zvezda. The Soviet space program and its successor the Russian space program, as well as space programs (including NASA) of other countries, have used Orlans for spacewalks (EVAs).

== History ==
The first spacewalk using an Orlan suit took place on December 20, 1977, on the Soviet space station Salyut 6, during the Soyuz 26 mission. Yuri Romanenko and Georgi Grechko tested the Orlan-D space suit. The Orlan-DM was used for the first time on August 2, 1985, by the cosmonauts Vladimir Dzhanibekov and Viktor Savinykh of Salyut 7.

The Orlan space suits were used for spacewalks on the Salyut stations, but for Mir they were replaced by the Orlan-DMA and Orlan-M suits: The Orlan-DMA was used for the first time in November 1988, by the cosmonaut Musa Manarov from the Mir space station. The Orlan-M continued in use on Mir from 1997 until the end of the station's operational life and is now used on the International Space Station. Orlan space suits have been used by Russian, American, European, Canadian and Chinese astronauts.

On February 3, 2006, a retired Orlan fitted with a radio transmitter, dubbed SuitSat-1, was launched into orbit from the International Space Station.

In April 2004, China imported 13 Orlan spacesuits from Russia: Three for EVA, two for airlock training, four for neutral buoyancy tank training, four for testing the EVA support system on the Shenzhou spacecraft. Various components on the EVA suits and airlock training suits, including electrical and communication equipments, were designed and manufactured by China. In Chinese, Orlan spacesuits are referred by the literal translation of Орлан, Haiying. (Chinese: 海鹰; pinyin: Hǎiyīng; lit. 'sea eagle') On 27 September 2008, Liu Boming wore one of the Orlan suits in order to assist Zhai Zhigang during the space walk portion of Shenzhou 7 mission.

In June 2009, the latest computerized Orlan-MK version was tested during a five-hour spacewalk to install new equipment on the International Space Station. The new suit's main improvement is the replacement of the radio-telemetry equipment in the Portable Life Support System backpack which contains a mini-computer. This computer processes data from the spacesuit's various systems and provides a malfunction warning. It then outlines a contingency plan which is displayed on an LCD screen on the right chest part of the spacesuit.

In September 2020, it was announced that Zvezda had started manufacturing space suits for Indian astronauts, part of the Gaganyaan crewed mission, four of which had begun training at the Gagarin Cosmonaut Training Center in Russia in 2019.

== Design ==
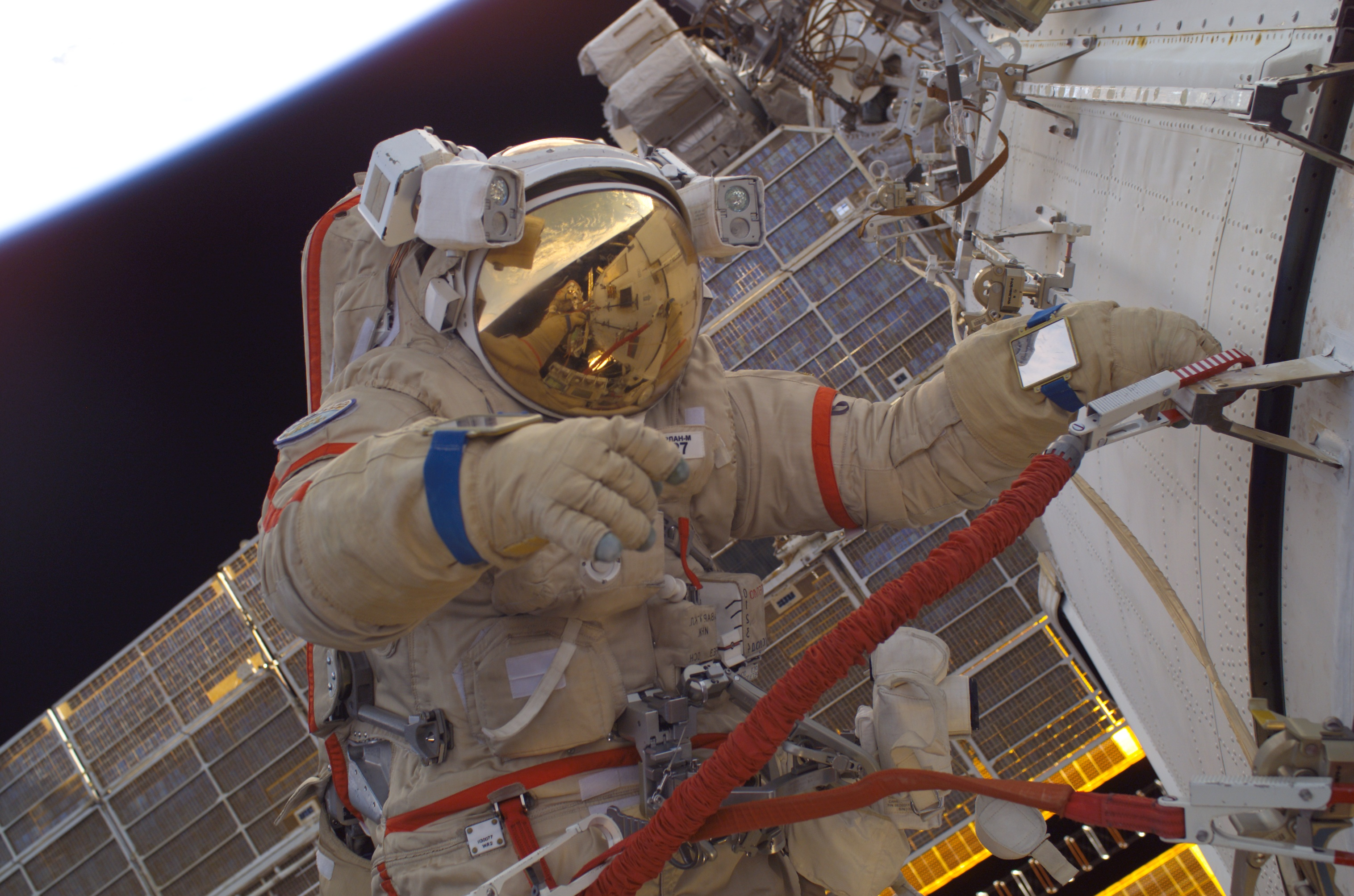
Attired in a Russian Orlan-M spacesuit, astronaut John Phillips participates in an extra-vehicular activity. Cosmonaut Sergei Krikalev is seen in Phillips' helmet visor.

The Orlan space suit has gone through several models. Space-rated designations include the Orlan-D, Orlan-DM, Orlan-DMA, and Orlan-M models; the Orlan-GN, Orlan-T, and Orlan-V are used in training and are used underwater. The latest model, called Orlan-MKS, has been used on the ISS since 2017. The original Orlan suit, with a two and a half hour operation time, was designed as an orbital suit for use on the Soviet Lunar programme, although it was abandoned in favour of a model with a greater operating capacity. The Orlan-D expanded the operation time to three hours; the Orlan-M to nine hours. The designed average lifespan of the spacesuit is four years (or up to 15 EVA's) and, according to tradition at the manufacturing plant, suits with blue stripes are assigned even production numbers and red, odd numbers.

The Orlan space suit is semi-rigid, with a solid torso and flexible arms. It includes a rear hatch entry through the backpack that allows it to be donned relatively quickly (approximately five minutes). The first Orlan suits were attached to the spacecraft by an umbilical tether that supplied power and communications links. The Orlan-DM and later models are self-sustaining.

== Models ==
=== Lunar orbit suit ===
- Name: Orlan Lunar Orbital Spacesuit
- Missions: Developed from 1967 to 1971, no operational models produced.
- Operating pressure: 400 hPa (5.8 psi)
- Mass: 59 kg (130 lb)
- Primary life support: 5 hours

=== D model ===
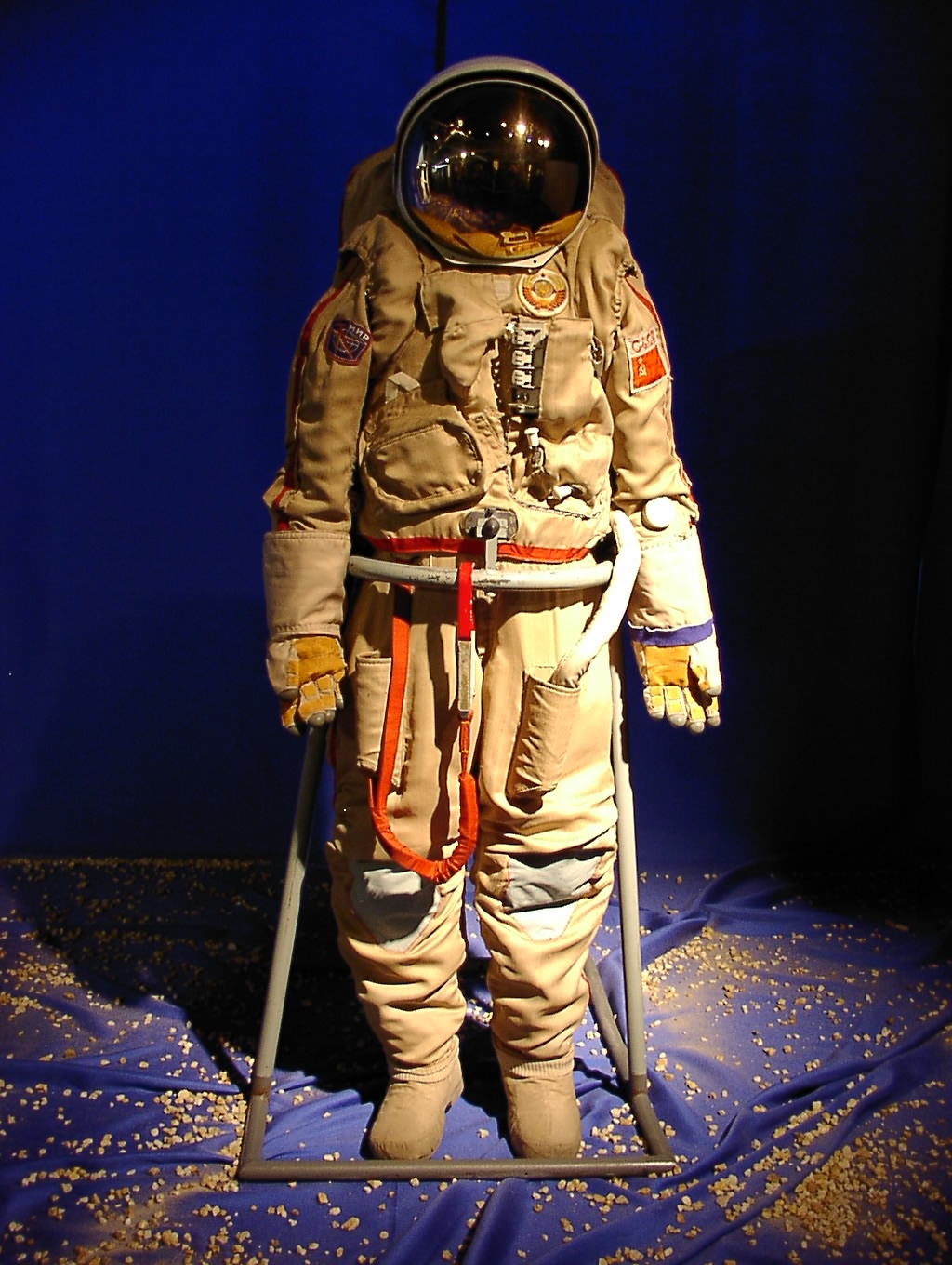
Orlan-D

- Name: Orlan-D
- Missions: Developed from 1969 to 1977. Used on Salyut-6 and Salyut-7 from 1977 to 1984.
- Operating pressure: 400 hPa (5.8 psi)
- Mass: 73.5 kg (162 lb)
- Primary Life Support: 5 hours

=== DM model ===
- Name: Orlan-DM
- Missions: Used on Salyut-7 and Mir from 1985 to 1988.
- Operating pressure: 400 hPa (5.8 psi)
- Mass: 88 kg (194 lb)
- Primary life support: 6 hours

=== DMA model ===
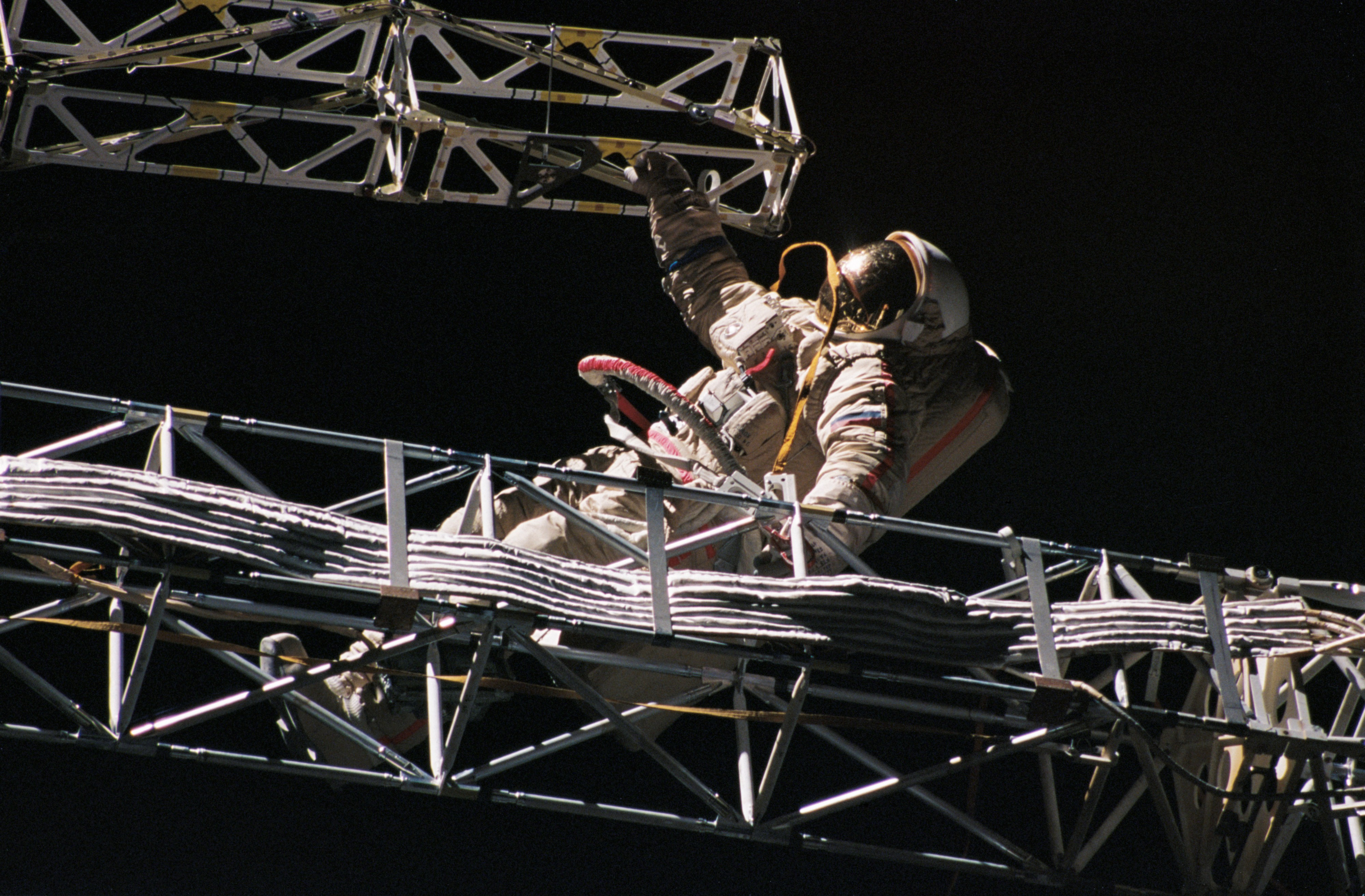
Orlan-DMA

- Name: Orlan-DMA
- Missions: Used on Mir from 1988 to 1997.
- Operating pressure: 400 hPa (5.8 psi)
- Mass: 105 kg (231 lb)
- Primary life support: 7 hours

=== M model ===
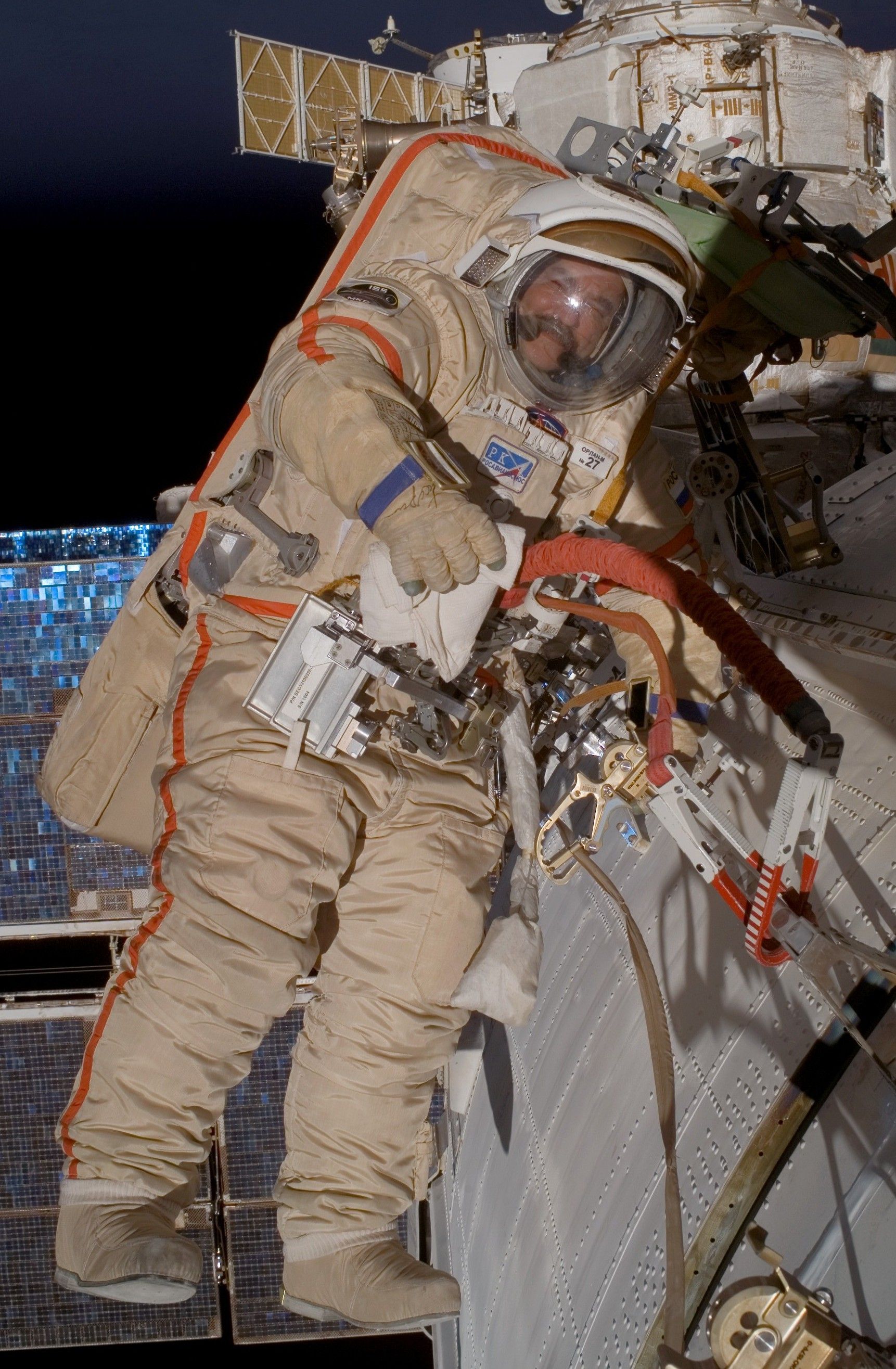
Orlan-M

- Name: Orlan-M
- Missions: Used on Mir and ISS from 1997 to 2009.
- Operating pressure: 400 hPa (5.8 psi)
- Mass: 112 kg (247 lb)
- Primary life support: 7 hours

=== MK model ===
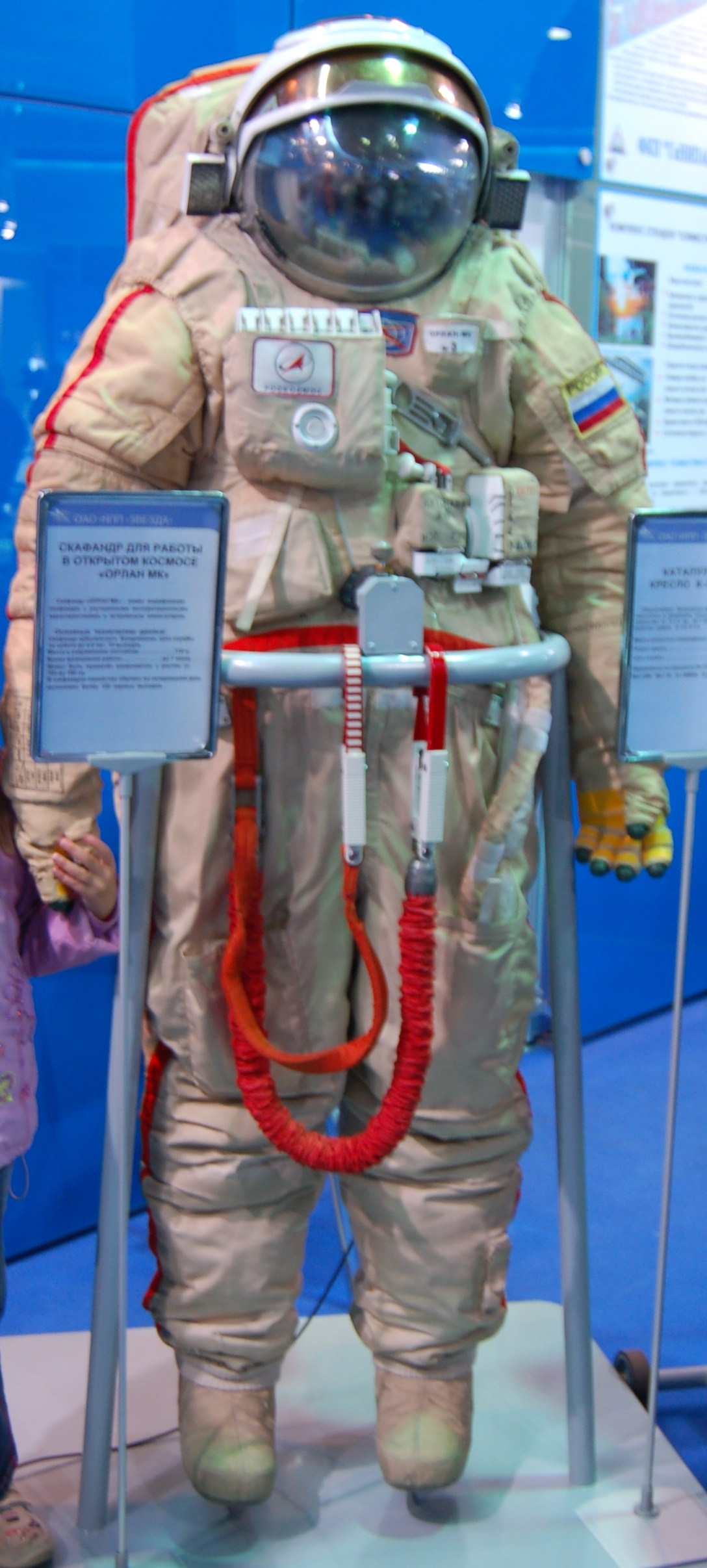
Orlan-MK

- Name: Orlan-MK
- Missions: Used on ISS from 2009 to 2017.
- Operating pressure: 400 hPa (5.8 psi)
- Mass: 120 kg (260 lb)
- Primary life support: 7 hours

=== MKS model ===
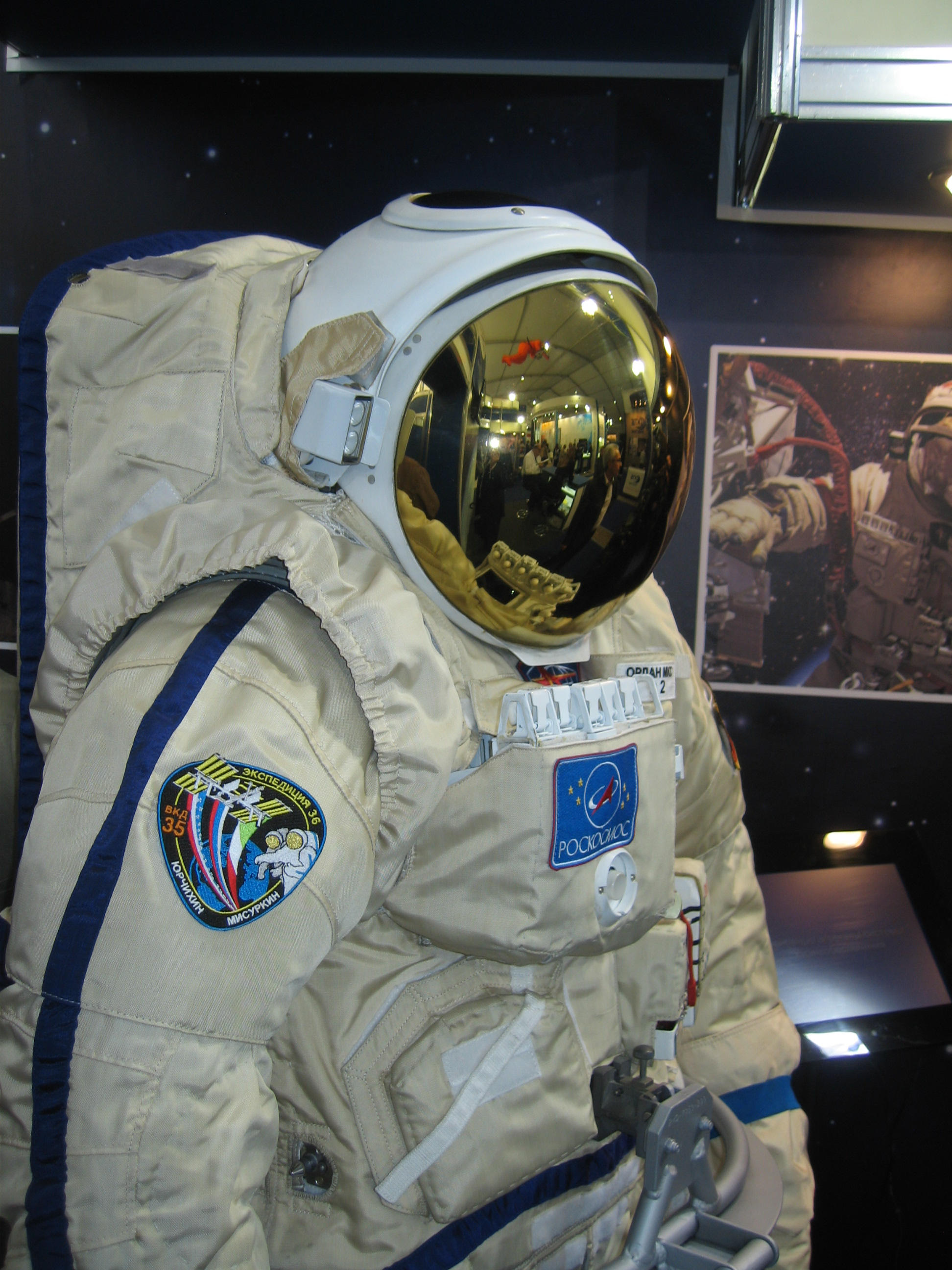
Spacesuit Orlan-MKS No.2 at MAKS-2013 (air show)

- Name: Orlan-MKS
- Missions: Used on ISS since 2017.
- Operating pressure: 400 hPa (5.8 psi)
- Mass: 110 kg (240 lb)
- Primary life support: 7 hours
- Service life: 6 years; 15–20 EVAs

== Training ==
Orlan suits are used in the Yuri Gagarin Cosmonauts Training Center in Star City, Moscow: the Orlan-GN for water immersion training, the Orlan-T for airlock procedure training, and the Orlan-V for low gravity flight training.

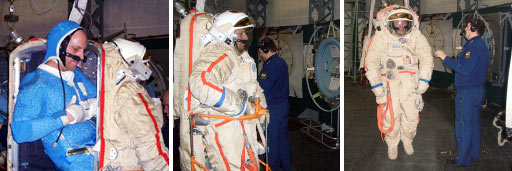
Clayton Anderson enters an Orlan-M suit through the rear hatch. (NASA)

== See also ==
- Berkut
- Krechet-94
- SK-1 spacesuit
- Hard Upper Torso
- Liquid Cooling and Ventilation Garment
- Sokol space suit
- Soviet SPK
- List of spacewalks
- List of Mir spacewalks
- List of ISS spacewalks
- List of spacewalks and moonwalks
- List of cumulative spacewalk records
