= Sokol space suit =

Soviet/Russian spacesuit used on Soyuz

Sokol
- Cокол
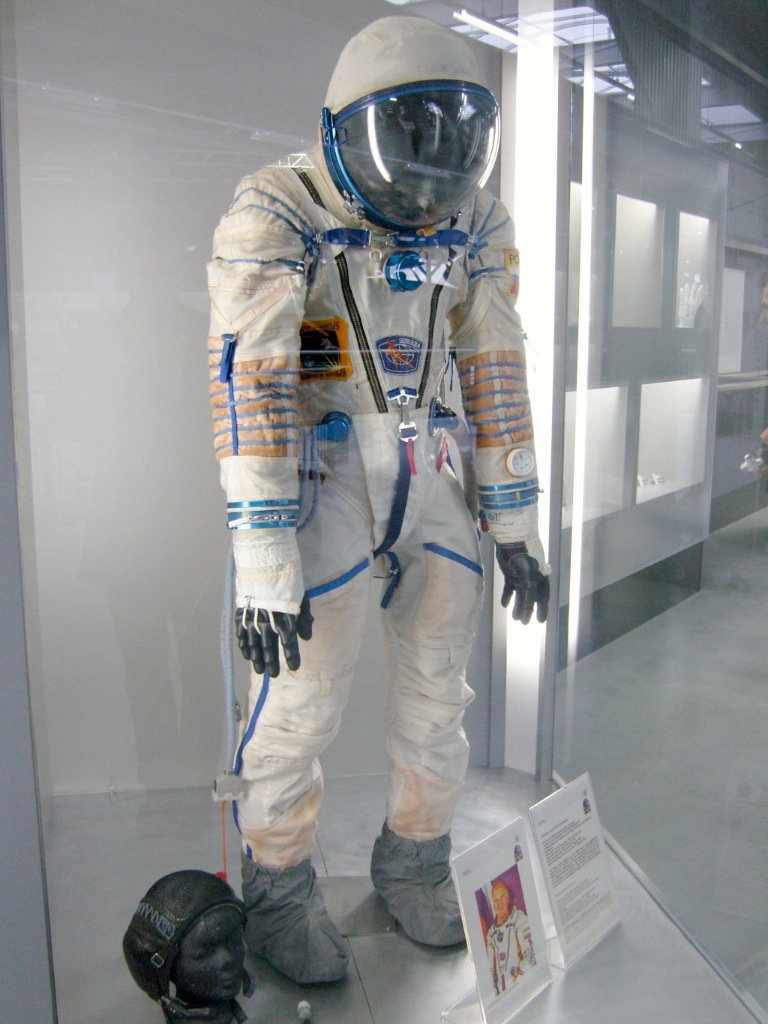
- Sokol-KV2 on display at the Technik Museum Speyer, Germany
- Type: pressure suit, space suit
- Manufacturer: NPP Zvezda
- Operating pressure: 400 hPa (5.8 psi)
- Mass: 10–12 kg (22–26 lb)
- Used for: Soyuz, Shenzhou

The Sokol space suit (Russian: Cокол, lit. 'Falcon') is a series of soft-body pressure suits designed and built by NPP Zvezda. It was first introduced in 1973 for the Soviet space program following the Soyuz 11 disaster, and continues to see use in the modern day primarily by the Russian space program, being worn by space travelers flying aboard the Soyuz spacecraft. A version of Sokol is also used by the China Manned Space Program.

Sokol is described by its makers as a rescue suit and it is not capable of being used outside the spacecraft in a spacewalk or extravehicular activity. Instead, its purpose is to keep the wearer alive in the event of an accidental depressurization of the spacecraft.

== History ==
Pressure suits were worn on the early Soviet Vostok space missions, but when the Soyuz spacecraft was being developed in the mid-1960s, its designers, OKB-1, did not incorporate the use of spacesuits into its design. Some of the early Soyuz flights carried Yastreb space suits but these were only for spacewalks and were only worn in orbit.

On June 30, 1971, the crew of Soyuz 11 died when their spacecraft depressurized during re-entry. One of the recommendations of the investigating government commission was that pressure suits should be worn by future crews during critical phases of their mission—launch, docking and landing.

NPP Zvezda was given the task of providing the suits. They rejected the use of existing Soviet space suits and chose to base a new suit on the existing Sokol aviation pressure suit. The main modification was the replacement of the Sokol suit's hard helmet. Other features of the aviation suit that were considered unnecessary were removed to save weight.

At the same time, a life support system was developed in co-operation with OKB-1. The new suit was named Sokol-K, K (Kosmos) being the abbreviation of the Russian word for space.

== Description ==
The modern version of Sokol consists of an inner pressure layer of rubberized polycaprolactam and an outer layer of white nylon canvas. The boots of the suit are integrated and unable to be removed. The gloves are removable, attaching to the suit via blue anodized aluminum wrist couplings. Sokol has a hinged polycarbonate visor mounted near the ears which seals with an anodized aluminum clavicle flange when closed, and a 'soft helmet' fabric hood which folds when the visor is raised.

There is a suit pressure gauge on the left wrist. A mirror on an elastic wrist band is worn on the right, to help the wearer see beyond the suit's limited field of view. During re-entry, an altimeter on a wrist strap may also be worn, allowing an immediate check on cabin pressure and an additional method of advance warning to brace prior to touchdown, as during the last phase of landing the cabin opens to the outside air.

Sokol is often worn with a wristwatch, with an elastic band replacing the strap to allow it to fit over the bulky suit glove.The watches are often privately purchased, and a wide variety of Swiss and Russian models have been used.

Electrical cables are mounted on the right abdomen of the suit, while the left abdomen has separate hoses for air and oxygen. Normally, an electric blower ventilates the suit with cabin air through the larger hose at the rate of 150 litres (5.3 cubic feet) per minute. If the cabin pressure drops below 600 hectopascals (0.59 standard atmospheres; 8.7 pounds per square inch), the suit's air supply is automatically replaced with oxygen from pressurized bottles at a rate of 22 litres (0.78 cubic feet) per minute. Both air and oxygen exhaust through the blue pressure relief valve at the center of the chest; this valve also regulates the pressure of the suit.

Effectively, the suit uses an open-circuit life support system that somewhat resembles scuba equipment. This has the advantage of simplicity; the disadvantage of a high rate of oxygen consumption is considered acceptable given that it is only intended for emergency use.

The suits weigh around 10 kilograms (22 lb) and are described by those who have used them as a considerable encumbrance when worn on the ground. Despite this, they are intended to be worn for up to 30 hours in a pressurized environment or two hours in a vacuum. They can also float and have a neck dam that allows the visor to be raised in water without the risk of flooding the suit. However, Soyuz crews are provided with buoyancy aids and cold-water survival suits which would preferably be used if the Soyuz accidentally landed in water.

As of 2002, a total of 309 flight suits had been made along with 135 training and testing suits.

== Operational use ==
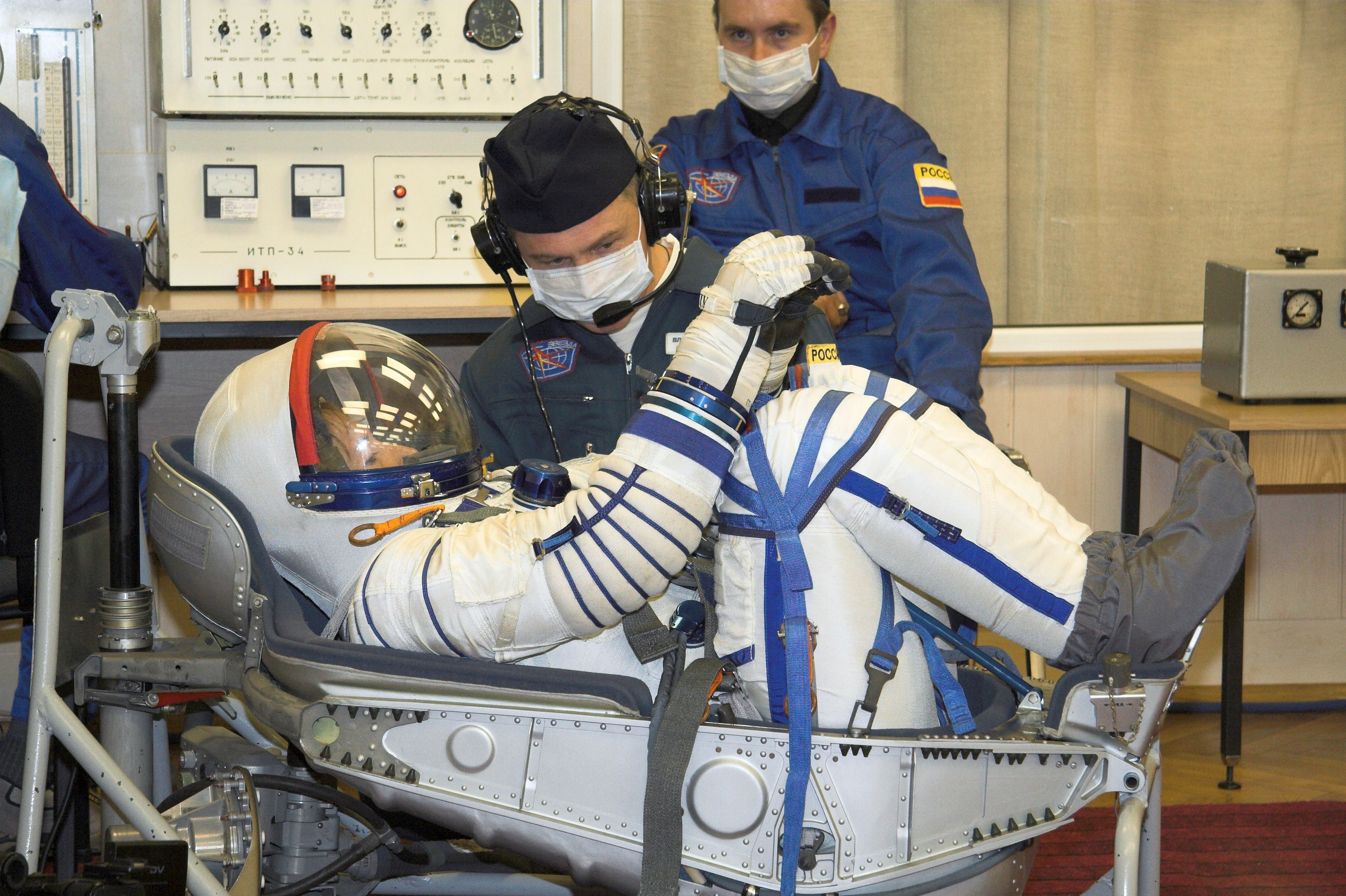
Peggy Whitson wearing an inflated Sokol-KV2 spacesuit (2007)

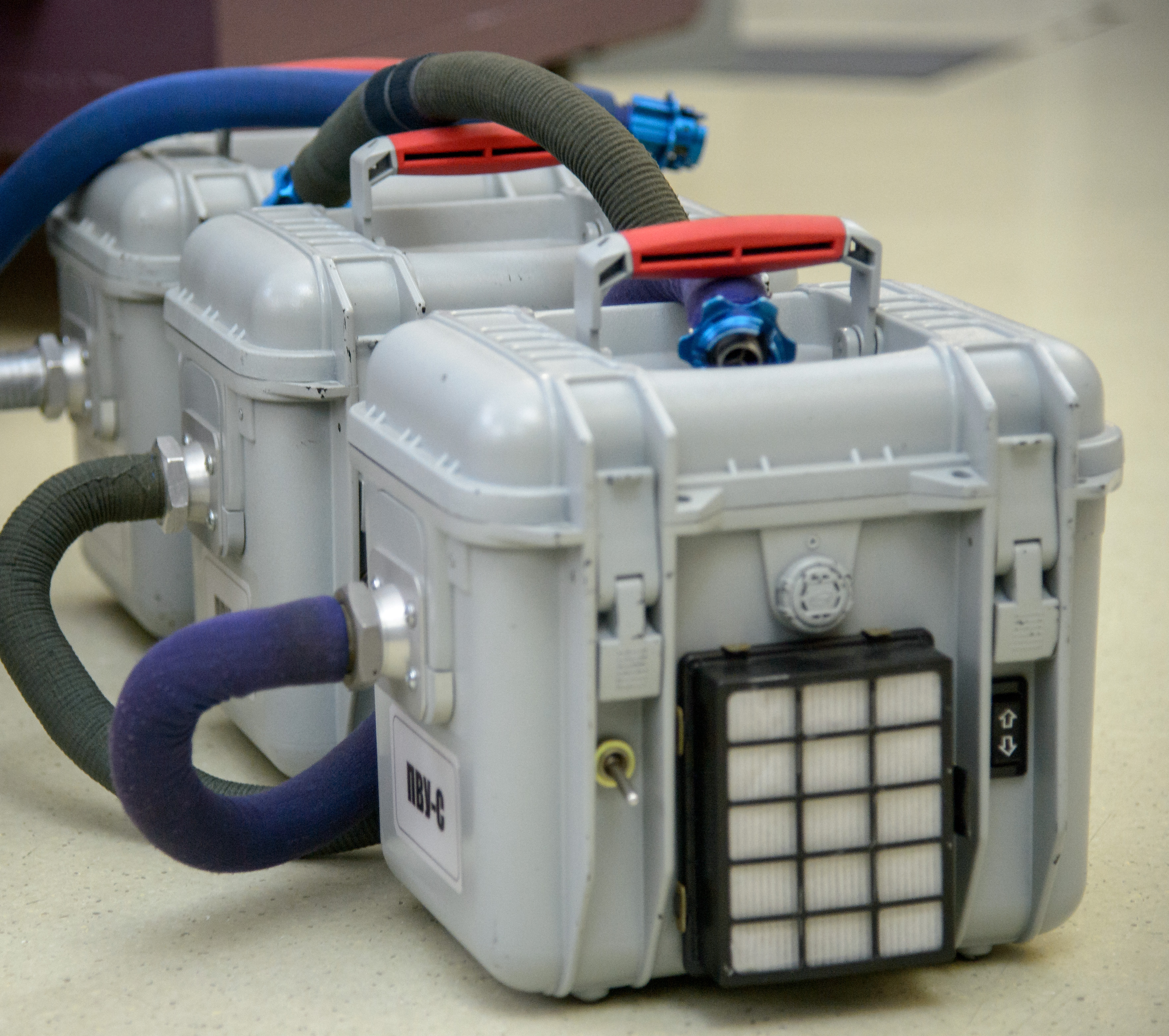
Sokol portable ventilation units

Each Soyuz crew member is provided with a made-to-measure suit for flight (although, from the numbers made, it appears that the suits provided for ground training are re-used). To ensure the suit fits correctly, the wearer spends two hours sitting in a launch couch with the suit inflated. Straps on the arms, legs and chest allow the fit to be adjusted slightly.

To don the suit, the two zips that make a 'V' on the chest are opened. Underneath, there is a large tubular opening in the inner pressure layer known as the appendix. Legs go in first, followed by the arms into the sleeves and head into the helmet. When the suit is on, an airtight seal is made by tightly rolling up the appendix and securing it with strong elastic bands. The large bulge of the rolled-up appendix is secured under the V-shaped flap in the suit's outer layer. When worn on the ground, the suit is attached to a portable ventilation unit—a hand-held device that supplies air to the suit, cooling it first with an ice filled heat exchanger. Grey leather outer boots are also worn on the ground; they protect the feet of the suit from damage and are removed before entering the spacecraft to avoid carrying debris into the cabin.

The suit is worn during launch and re-entry of the Soyuz spacecraft—the gloves are attached and the visor is sealed at these times. In an emergency, the suit pressure is usually maintained at 400 hPa (0.39 atm, 5.8 psi) above the ambient by the pressure relief valve. However, the suits only have a rudimentary pressure relief layer so they tend to balloon when inflated. Movement of the wearer becomes restricted, although it is still possible to pilot inside the capsule.

If more than limited movement is required, the pressure relief valve may be adjusted to a lower setting of 270 hPa (0.26 atm, 3.9 psi). Pure oxygen at this pressure will support life, but the setting is only intended for use in extreme emergencies; the risk of decompression sickness becomes significant if the wearer spends more than 15 minutes at the lower pressure setting.

The maximum length of time the suits may be used in a vacuum is 125 minutes. The time is limited because the oxygen flow to the suit is enough for life support, but insufficient to carry away the cosmonaut's body heat and longer use of the suit risks heat exhaustion. If the capsule becomes depressurized, either accidentally or deliberately to extinguish a fire, it must land within that time.

== Variants ==
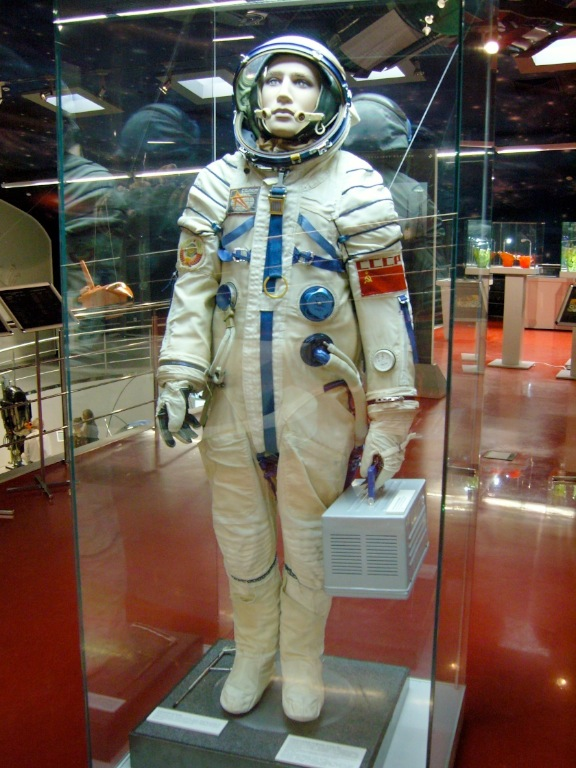
A Sokol-K spacesuit displayed at the Memorial Museum of Cosmonautics, Moscow (2009)

=== Sokol-K ===
The first version of the suit, first used on Soyuz 12, launched on September 27, 1973.

==== Specifications ====
- Name: Sokol-K Rescue Spacesuit
- Derived from: Sokol aviation full pressure suit
- Manufacturer: NPP Zvezda
- Missions: Soyuz 12 (1973) to Soyuz 40 (1981)
- Function: Intravehicular activity (IVA)
- Operating pressure: 400 hPa (5.8 psi)
- Suit weight: 10 kg (22 lb)

=== Sokol-KR ===
A version intended for use with the TKS spacecraft which was to be used as part of the Almaz program. The suit was never used, as TKS never flew with a crew. Its main difference was that it was designed to work with a regenerative life support system.

=== Sokol-KM and Sokol-KV ===
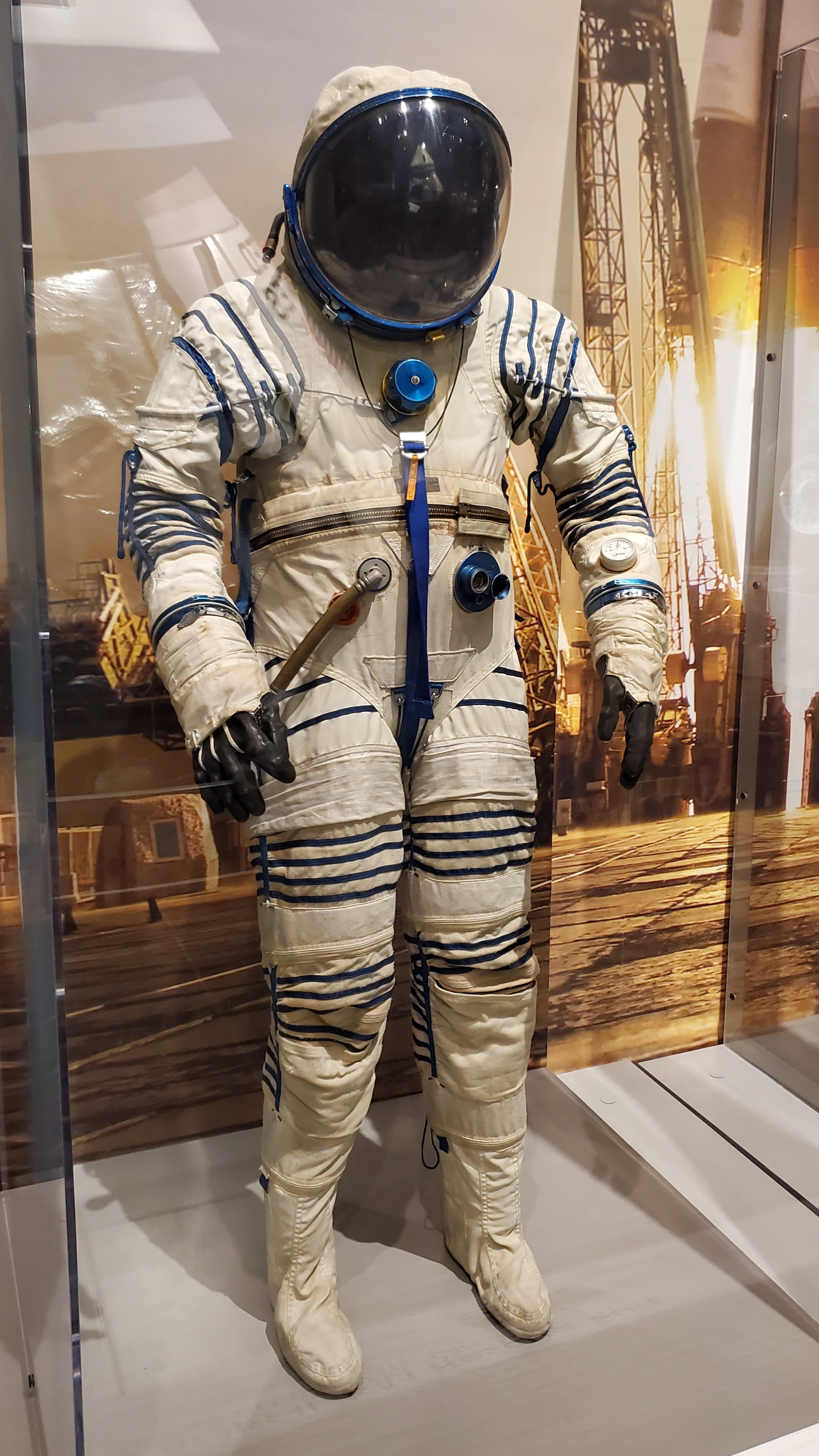
Sokol-KM on display at the Tellus Science Museum

Work on improving the Sokol-K began in 1973, immediately after its introduction. The Sokol-KM and KV were intermediate models on which many of the features of the Sokol-KV2 were developed, neither was ever used in space.

To be donned, the Sokol-KM and KV split into upper and lower halves joined by zip fasteners. However, this feature was discarded in the Sokol-KV2 and the appendix was retained as a means of donning the suit—it was thought to be more reliable than the airtight zippers the Russians were able to make. Other changes included alterations to the fabric around the joints, to improve mobility, and improvement of the gloves, to make it easier to operate the spacecraft controls.

The KM and KV also featured a liquid-cooled undergarment that would increase the comfort of the wearer by efficiently removing body-heat; other suits relied on the flow of air to do this.

==== Specifications ====
- Name: Sokol-KV Rescue Spacesuit
- Manufacturer: NPP Zvezda
- Missions: None
- Function: Intra-vehicular activity (IVA)
- Operating pressure: 400 hPa (5.8 psi)
- Suit weight: 12 kg (26 lb)

=== Sokol-KV2 ===
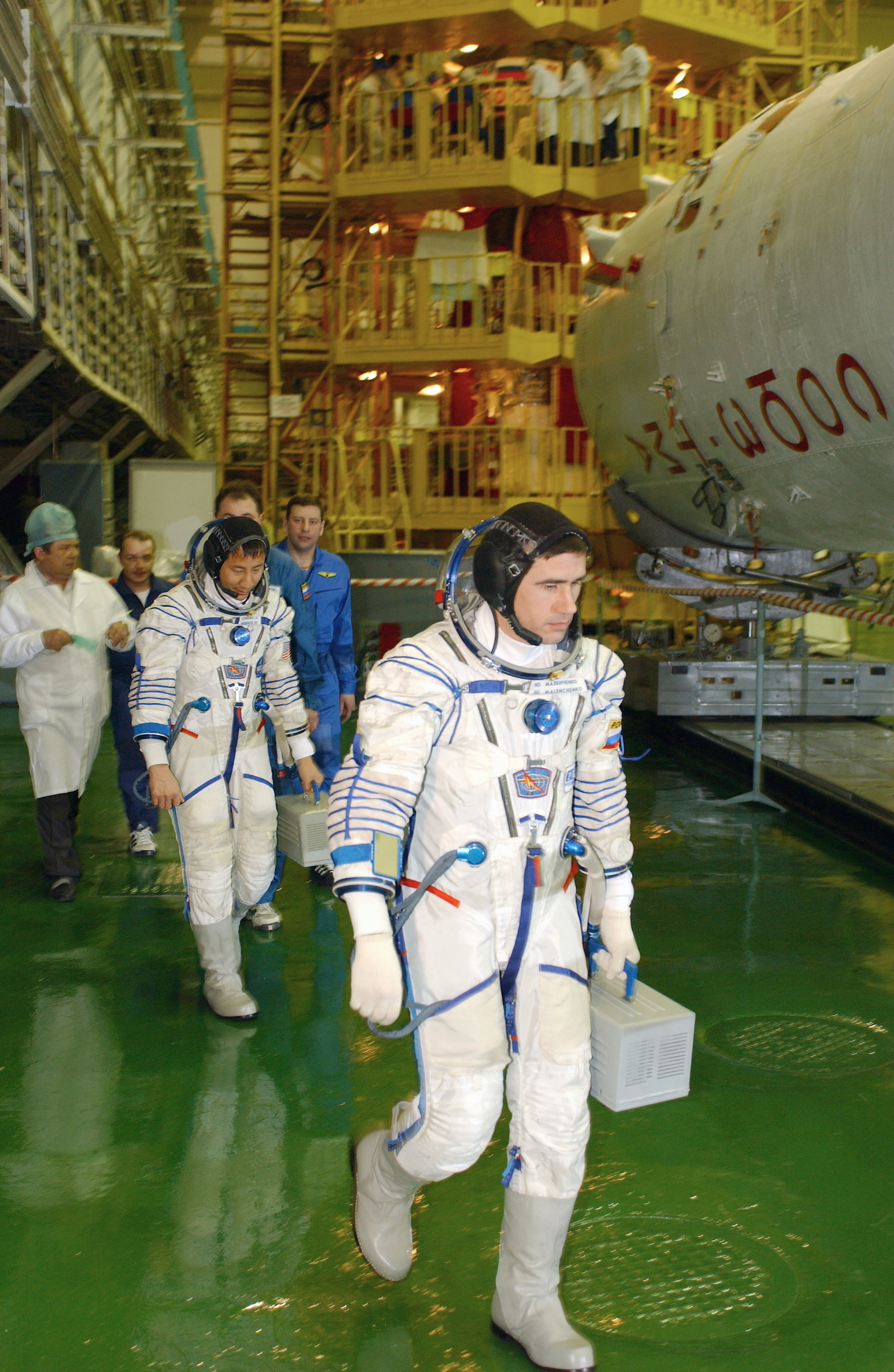
The crew of Expedition 7, Commander Yuri Malenchenko (front) and Ed Lu are both wearing Sokol KV2 pressure suits.

The Sokol-KV2, the current version of the suit, was first used on the Soyuz T-2 mission, launched on June 5, 1980.

The main improvement was the replacement of the rubber pressure layer of the Sokol-K with rubberized polycaprolactam to save weight. The visor was modified and enlarged to give the wearer a better field of view. Laces in the outer canvas layer were replaced with zippers to make the suit quicker to don and the pressure relief valve was moved from the left abdomen to the center of the chest so either hand could be used to alter the suit's pressure setting. The improved arms, legs, and gloves of the Sokol-KV were retained although the liquid cooled undergarment of the KM and KV was discarded.

==== Specifications ====
- Name: Sokol-KV2 Rescue Spacesuit
- Manufacturer: NPP Zvezda
- Missions: 1980 to present
- Function: Intra-vehicular activity (IVA)
- Operating pressure: 400 hPa (5.8 psi)
- Suit weight: 10 kg (22 lb)

== Use by countries other than Russia ==
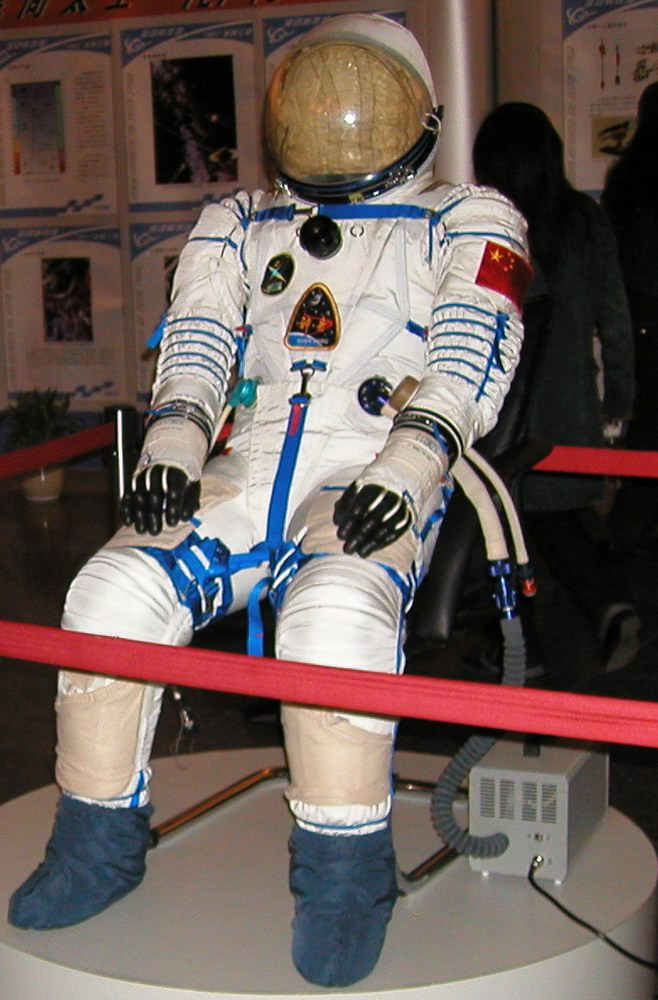
Chinese spacesuit worn by Yang Liwei during the Shenzhou 5 space flight

The People's Republic of China purchased a number of space suits from the Russians for use in the China Manned Space Program. The suit worn by Yang Liwei on Shenzhou 5, the first crewed Chinese spaceflight, closely resembles a Sokol-KV2 suit, but it is believed to be a Chinese-made version rather than an actual Russian suit. Derivative versions of Sokol continue to be worn by Chinese taikonauts on flights of the Shenzhou spacecraft today, though details of the suits' design differ slightly; they are also reported to weigh less than the Russian version of Sokol.

Sokol suits have been bought for uses other than spaceflight. It was planned that the crew of the British QinetiQ 1 high-altitude balloon would wear modified Sokol suits purchased from Zvezda. As the balloonists would have occupied an open platform during their twelve-hour flight, the Sokol suits, together with heavily insulated outer garments, would have protected them from the cold and low pressure of the stratosphere as the balloon ascended to a height of around 40 km (130,000 ft).

Bulgaria developed its own version of the Sokol space suit in the mid-1970s.

== U.S. equivalent ==
During the flight of Gemini 7 in 1965, Frank Borman and Jim Lovell wore modified Gemini spacesuits sharing some similarities with the Sokol suits, but with significant differences. Their suits were known as the G5C by their manufacturer, the David Clark Company.

== Collectors' market ==
Sokol space suits, including ones flown in space, were first sold by Sotheby's at an auction devoted to Russian space history in 1993. Subsequently, components such as gloves, communications caps, and wrist mirrors have frequently come up for sale on eBay; even complete suits have occasionally come up for sale, such as the one that Heritage Auctions sold for US$31,070 in 2009. These are usually worn out items that have been discarded after use during ground training and were never intended for use in space. As these items are nominally the property of the Russian government, the legitimacy of their sale has been questioned.

== See also ==
- Strizh (space suit)
- Advanced Crew Escape Suit
- Orlan space suit
