= Strizh (space suit) =

Soviet/Russian spacesuit to use on Buran-class orbiters

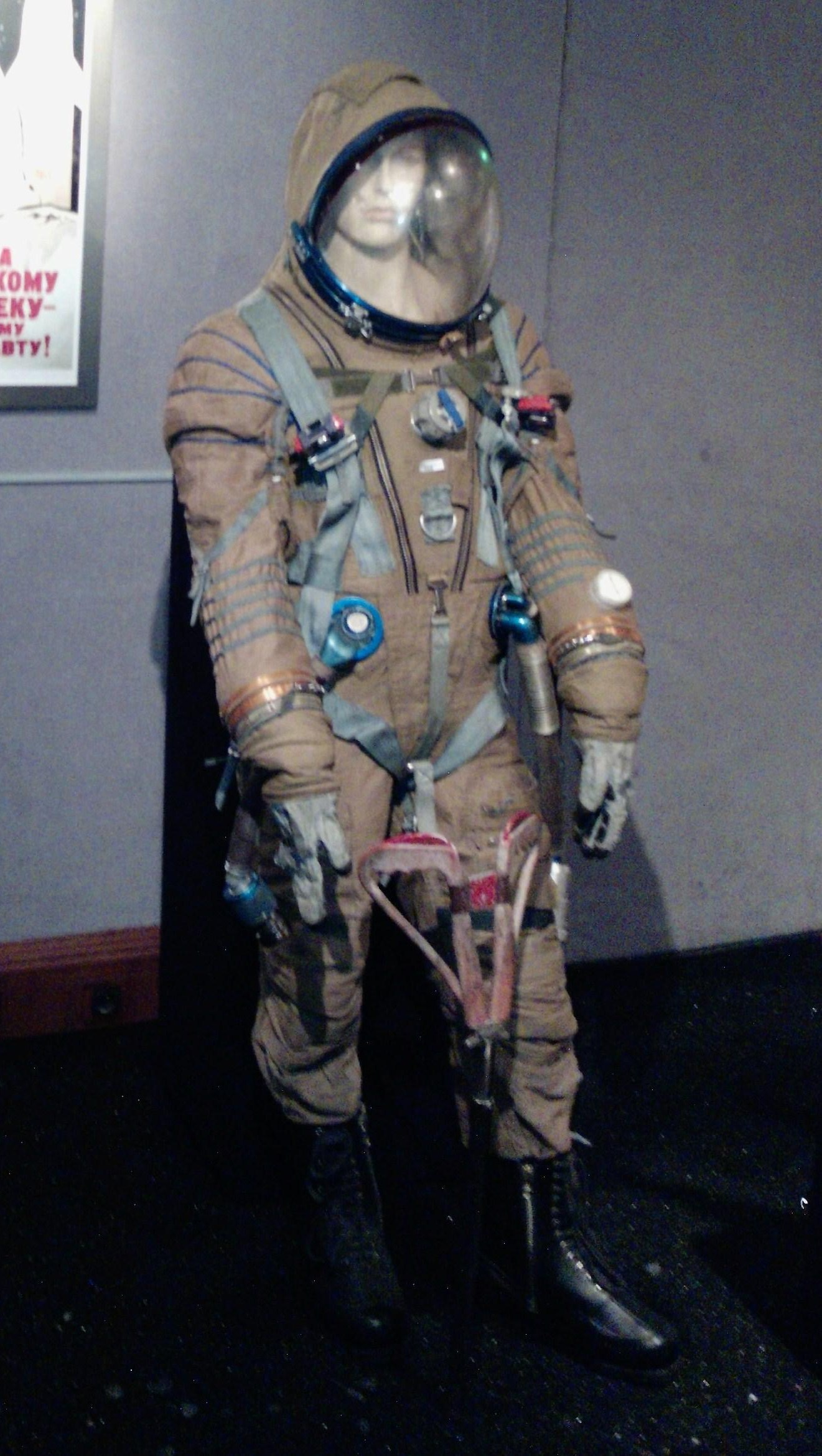
Strizh Suit

Strizh (Стриж meaning swift) is a space suit that was originally developed for the crew of the Soviet/Russian Buran-class orbiters. It resembled the Sokol space suit worn by Soyuz crew members. It was designed to protect cosmonauts during a possible ejection from the spacecraft at altitudes of up to 30 km and speeds of up to Mach 3; the Buran-class orbiters were designed to incorporate ejection seats similar to those found on the Space Shuttle Enterprise and Columbia (the latter later having the seats removed after the STS-4 mission).

The Strizh suits were constructed from olive drab colored nylon canvas with silver trim and lined with rubberized fabric and fitted with connectors for electrical, air and coolant umbilicals. They had an attached pressurized hood with a hinged visor fastened to an anodized aluminum flange. The sleeves had adjustable articulating cables fitted in the upper arms, while a support sling wrapped from chest to back by means of webbing belts and a metal harness. The gloves were detachable and fitted with rubber fingers and leather palms. The suit also had pleated knee sections. Utility pockets on the suit's thighs were intended to hold survival gear, such as a folding knife, a pistol and other items. A pressure gauge was fitted on the left sleeve and a pressure equalisation valve on the chest.

The Strizh spacesuit and the Buran ejection seat were tested during the ascent of a Soyuz booster in a series of five Progress launches (Progress 38 through 42) during 1988-1990.

The Strizh pressure suit, like its United States Air Force counterpart (itself based on the X-15 and Gemini space suit and now used as part of NASA's Advanced Crew Escape Suit), was produced in a modified variant (Baklan full pressure suit) for application on Russian high-altitude aircraft that lack pressurized cabins.

== Specifications ==
Allowed ejections up to an altitude of 30 km (100,000 ft) and speeds up to Mach 3.

Name: Strizh Rescue Spacesuit

Derived from: Baklan full pressure suit

Manufacturer: NPP Zvezda

Missions: Used on mannequins on the unmanned space shuttle Buran flight 1K1

Function: Intra-vehicular activity (IVA) and Ejection

Operating Pressure: 400 hPa (5.8 psi)

Suit Weight: 18 kg (40 lb)
