= Berkut spacesuit =

Soviet Spacesuit

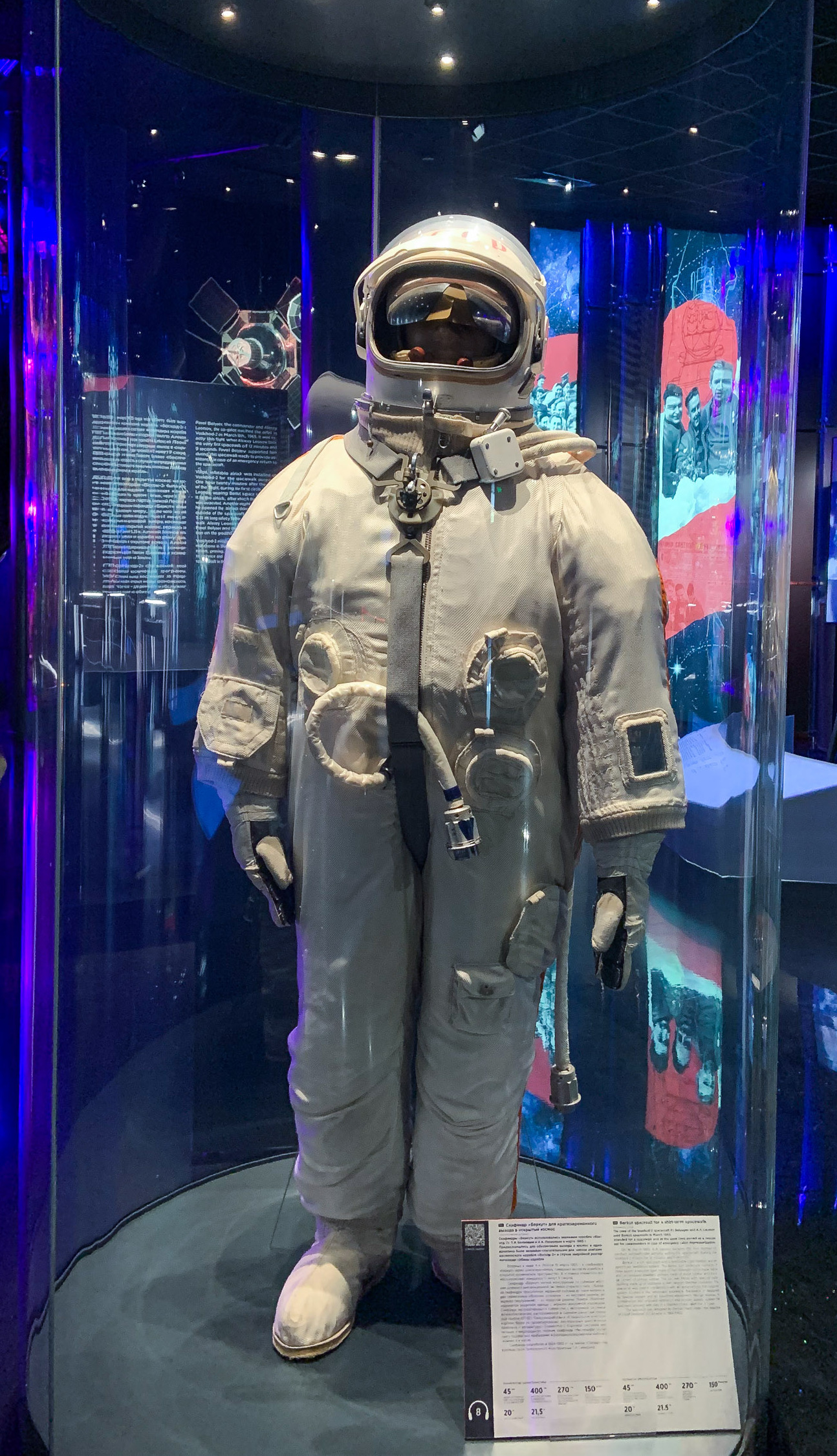
Berkut spacesuit

The Berkut (Russian Беркут, meaning golden eagle) is a space suit model developed to be used for extravehicular activity for the Voskhod 2 mission aboard a Voskhod spacecraft on the first spacewalk. It was developed by NPP Zvezda in 1964–1965. It was a modified SK-1 suit. It was only used by the Voskhod 2 crew.

== Description ==
The Berkut spacesuit had two pressurization settings, one at 0.27 atmospheres and the other at 0.40 atmospheres (nominal mode). Movement within the suit was seriously restricted.

The suit includes: helmet, spacesuit, and protective clothing. The astronaut's life is maintained through the on-board life support system or the backpack-type automatic system. The safety harness has been used during spacewalks.

The helmet of the suit cannot be rotated, and it has a quick-release buckle. It includes a hard hat, a lifting visor and a light filter. The helmet is made of aluminum alloy, the size does not affect the movement of the head. The visor of the helmet is made of aluminum alloy. A light filter similar to that on an aircraft is placed inside the helmet.

The astronaut's suit has a three-layer shell - a load-bearing layer on the outside and two sealed layers (main layer and backup layer) on the inside.

The protective clothing is a bodysuit made of durable fabric and has multiple layers of vacuum insulation.

The automated system consists of a KP-55 oxygen device and three oxygen cylinders placed in a backpack. Before going into space, the astronaut must put on the backpack and secure it to the spacesuit using a suspension system. Oxygen from the cylinders is directed into the helmet, then into the shell of the spacesuit and then released into the environment. A backup oxygen supply system is also provided - through a hose from the gas cylinders installed in the air chamber. This system is capable of regulating the pressure in the spacesuit.

The safety harness is 7 m long and includes shock absorbers, steel cables, emergency oxygen supply tubes, and electrical wires.

== Specifications ==
- Name: Berkut Spacesuit
- Derived from: SK-1 spacesuit
- Manufacturer: NPP Zvezda
- Missions: Voskhod 2
- Function: Intra-vehicular activity (IVA) and orbital Extra-vehicular activity (EVA)
- Operating Pressure: 400 hPa (5.8 psi)
- Suit Weight: 20 kg (44 lb)
- Backpack Weight: 21 kg (46 lb)
- Total Weight: 41 kg (90 lb)
- Primary Life Support: 45 minutes
