= NPP Zvezda K-36 =

Aircraft ejection seat

K-36
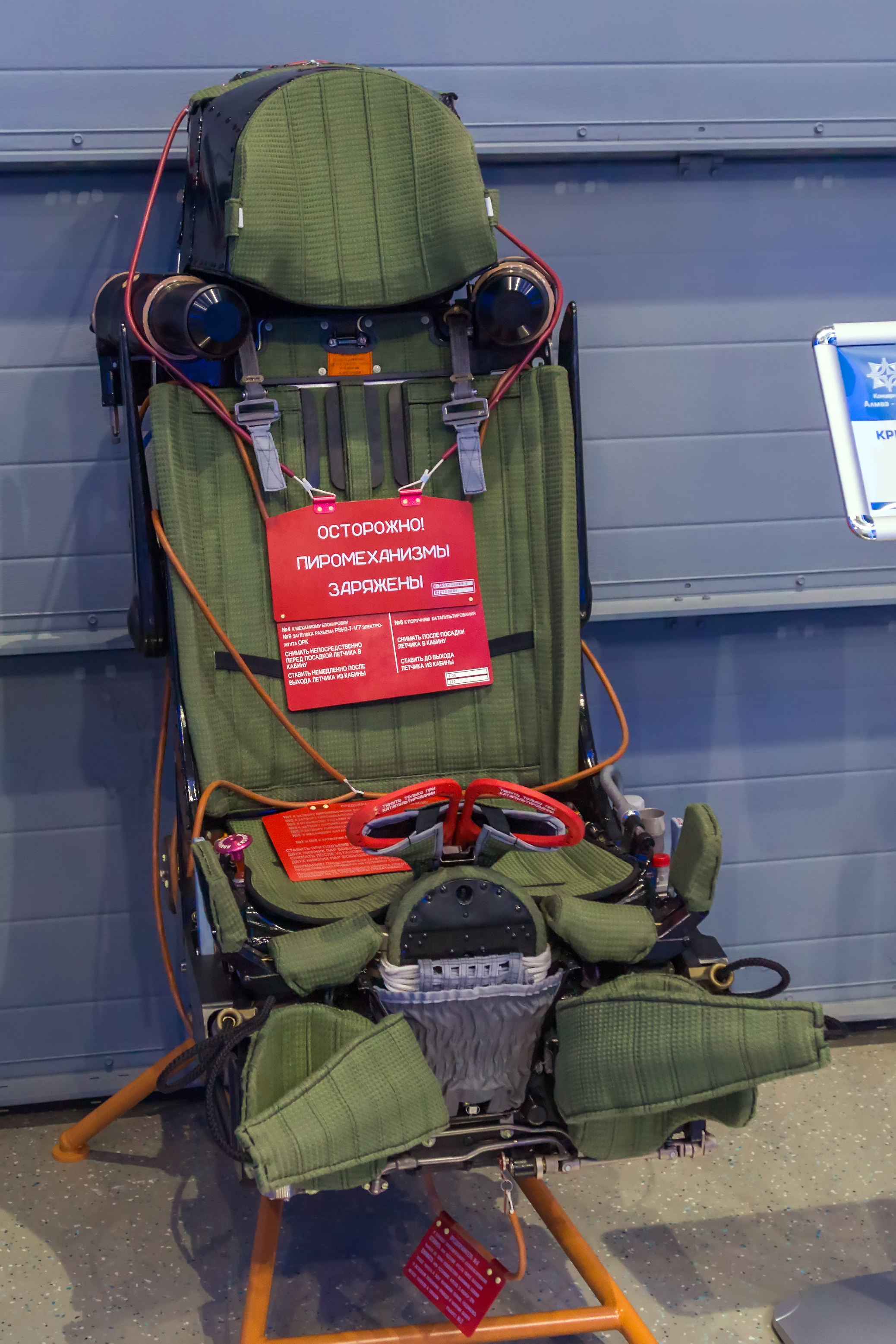
- A contemporary variant of the K-36DM ejection seat for modern Russian fighter aircraft.

The Zvezda K-36 is a series of ejection seats made by NPP Zvezda. Variants of this ejection seat have been used on a variety of aircraft, including the Su-25, Su-27, MiG-29, Su-30 and the Su-57.

== Design ==
The K-36 Ejection seat provides emergency escape for a crew member in a wide range of speeds and altitudes of aircraft flight, from zero altitude, zero speed (zero-zero) upwards, and can be used in conjunction with protective equipment, such as pressure suits and anti-g garments. The seat consists of the ejection rocket firing mechanism, gear box, headrest rescue system with a dome stowed in the headrest, and other operating systems all of which are aimed at providing a safe bail-out.

== Variants ==
- K-36D and K-36DM: Used on the MiG-29, Su-27, Su-30
- K-36D-3.5: Improved variant providing accommodation for pilots with sitting heights from 810 to 980 mm
- K-36D-5: Improved variant for the Sukhoi Su-35 and Sukhoi Su-57
- K-36L-3.5Y: Lightweight version used on the Yak-130.
- K-36LM: Used in the Tu-160 Blackjack
- K-36RB: Variant used on Buran programme
- K-36VM: Automatic ejection system (SKE) used successfully 20/20 times in the Yak-38

== Ejections ==
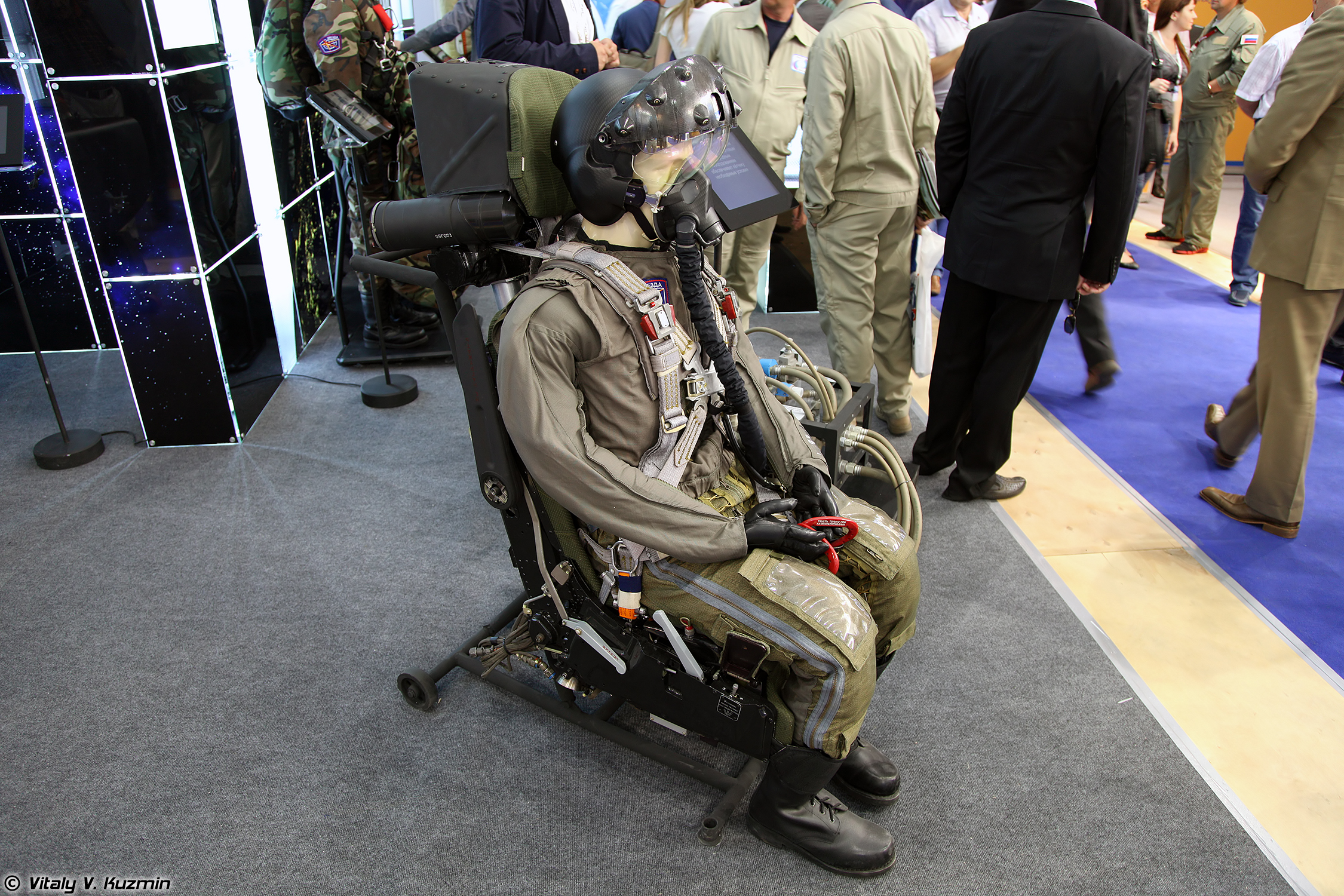
The K-36D-5 is used on the Sukhoi Su-35 and Sukhoi Su-57.

At the 1989 Paris Air Show when Anatoly Kvochur successfully completed a low-altitude ejection from a MiG-29 just prior to ground impact. Two more pilots survived when a pair of MiG-29s collided over Fairford, England, in 1993 at the Royal International Air Tattoo.

On 27 July 2002, during an air show at Sknyliv Airfield, a Ukrainian Air Force Sukhoi Su-27UB collided with the ground during an aerobatics demonstration. The pilots Vladimir Toponar and Yuri Egorov were able to eject from the aircraft from close to ground level. The incident was the deadliest air show accident in history.

== Applications ==
- Sukhoi Su-24
- Sukhoi Su-25
- Sukhoi Su-27
- Sukhoi Su-30
- Sukhoi Su-34
- Sukhoi Su-35
- Sukhoi Su-37
- Sukhoi Su-47
- Sukhoi Su-57
- Mikoyan MiG-29
- Mikoyan MiG-29K
- Mikoyan MiG-31
- Mikoyan MiG-35
- Mikoyan MiG 1.44
- Yakovlev Yak-38
- Yakovlev Yak-130
- Yakovlev Yak-141
- Tupolev Tu-22M
- Tupolev Tu-160

=== Proposed ===
- HAL Tejas
- FMA IA-63 Pampa
- Buran programme

== See also ==
- NPP Zvezda SKS-94
