= SK-1 spacesuit =

Spacesuit that was developed specially for Yuri Gagarin

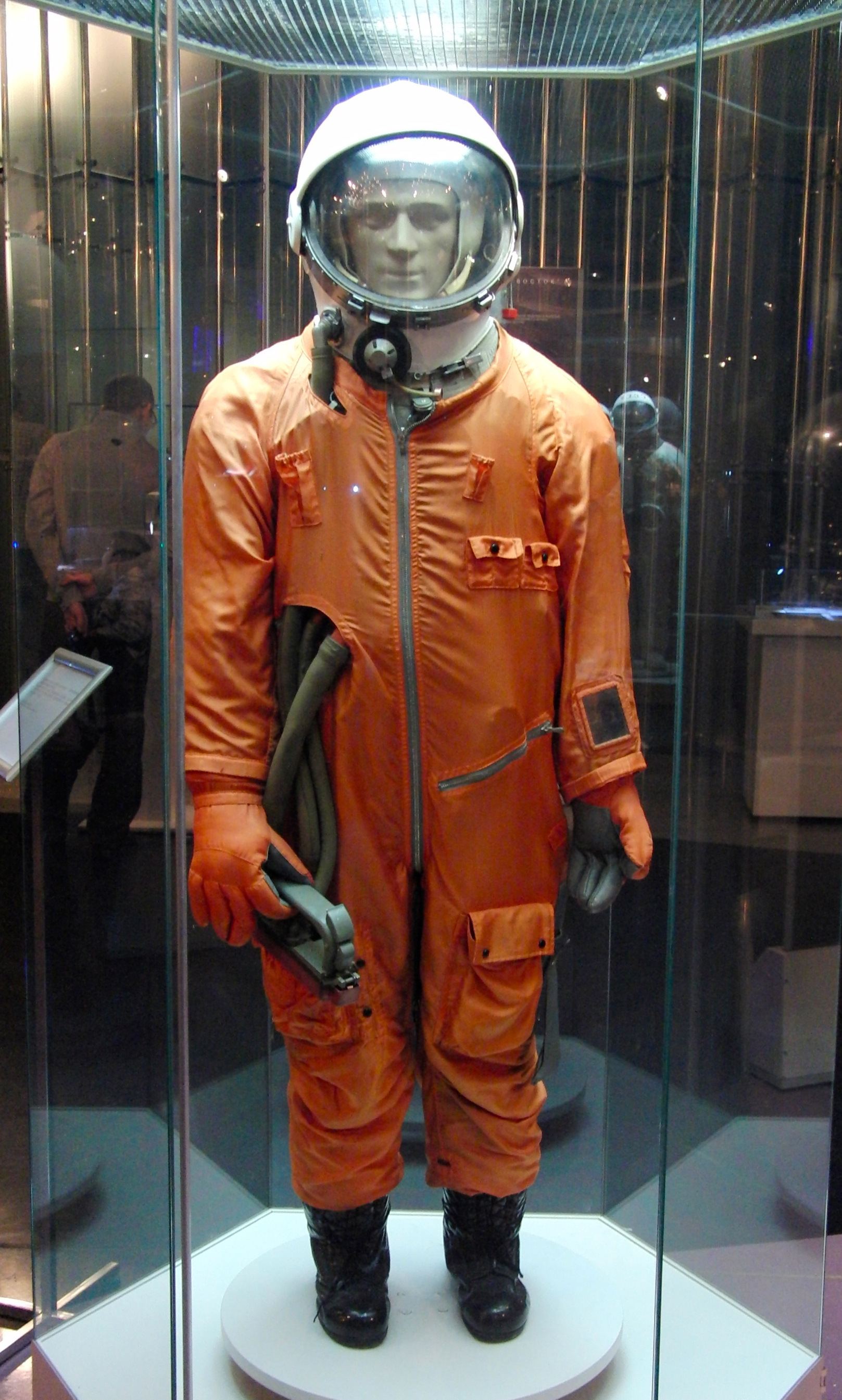
SK-1 space suit

SK-1 is an initialism of "Skafandr Kosmicheskiy" # 1 (Скафандр Космический = "diving suit for space") is a spacesuit that was developed specially for Yuri Gagarin. As such, it is the first spacesuit ever used. After his successful flight on the Vostok 1 spacecraft, spacesuits of the SK series were used for space flights of other cosmonauts on Vostok spacecraft, in which the cosmonauts would eject and land separately from module.

The SK-1 was used from 1961-1963.

== SK-2 (CK-2) ==
Almost exactly the same as the SK-1 but designed for a woman, it was on June 16 through 19th in 1963 on Vostok 6.

== Specifications ==
Allowed ejections up to 8 km (26,000 ft).

- Name: SK-1/SK-2 Spacesuit
- Manufacturer: NPP Zvezda
- Missions: Vostok 1 to Vostok 6
- Function: Intra-vehicular activity (IVA) and Ejection
- Operating Pressure: 270 to 300 hPa (3.9 to 4.4 psi)
- Suit Weight: 20 kg (44 lb)
- Primary Life Support: Vehicle Provided
