= NPP Zvezda SKS-94 =

Aircraft ejection system

Zvezda SKS-94 is a super-light ejection system designed for low-speed light aircraft, including trainers, acrobatic, patrol, agricultural and other light aircraft relating to general aviation. It is designed and manufactured by NPP Zvezda.

== History ==
Sukhoi Design Bureau issued in 1991 to NPP Zvezda requirements specifications for development of a super light pilot-rescue system to be used on sports planes. The system is now known under the designation SKS-94. The system was displayed in the 1995 Paris Air Show, and Su-31M became the world's first aerobatics aeroplane to be fitted with an ejection system.

== Applications ==
The ejection seat has been installed in the following aircraft types:

- Yakovlev Yak-152
- Yakovlev Yak-52
- Yakovlev Yak-54
- Sukhoi Su-26
- Sukhoi Su-29
- Sukhoi Su-31
- FMA IA 63 Pampa
