= Tomilino =

Tomilino Томилино
- Town
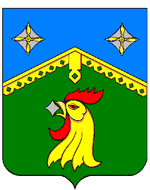
- Coat of arms
- Interactive map of Tomilino
- Location of Tomilino Tomilino (European Russia) Tomilino (Russia)
- Coordinates: 55°39′N 37°57′E
- Country: Russia
- Federal subject: Moscow Oblast
- Founded: 1894 (urban-type settlement status since 1961)

Government
  - Head of Administration: Igor Dvornikov
- Elevation: 134 m (440 ft)

Population (2010 Census)
  - Total: 30,605
  - Estimate (2025): 30,811 (+0.7%)

Administrative status
  - Subordinated to: Lyuberetsky District
- Time zone: UTC+3 (MSK)
- Postal codes: 140070, 140071, 140072
- Dialing code: +7 495
- OKTMO ID: 46748000071
- Website: www.tomilino.com

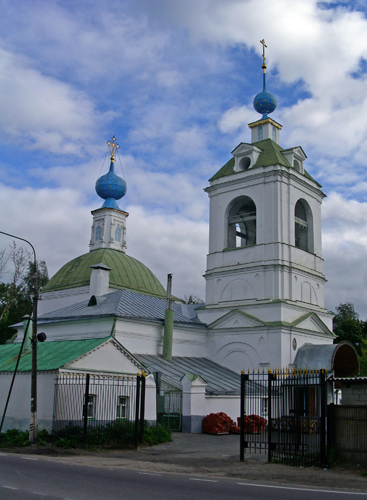
Zhilino church of the Assumption of the Divine Mother (18th century)

Tomilino (Russian: Томи́лино) is an urban locality (a work settlement) in Lyuberetsky District of Moscow Oblast, Russia. Population: 30,605 (2010 census); 28,545 (2002 census); 27,736 (1989 Soviet census). In terms of population, Tomilino is the largest urban-type settlement in Lyuberetsky District.

Tomilino consists of a multistory buildings sector and a private houses sector. Railway station in 25 kilometers (16 mi) southeast from Moscow.

In the 19th century, Tomilino was an estate of Obolensky knyazes. Tomilino was officially founded in 1894 by merchant Tomilin as a suburban settlement where he built his own house. It became very attractive for people because of a very close location to Moscow.

Later Tomilino became known as a scientific research, development, and production center. Some major enterprises were founded by the government. One of them is NPP Zvezda plant, famous for the spacesuits for Russian cosmonauts, including the one used by Yuri Gagarin, and aircraft ejector seats, which highly proved themselves in many extreme situations. There's also Mil Moscow Helicopter Plant ("Mil helicopters", "MVZ"), Tomilino plant of diamond equipment "TOMAL", Tomilino poultry farm and a textile mill. Tomilino semiconductor devices plant "TZPP" became operational at 1958. Tomilino is known as a worker's settlement since 1961.

There are several secondary schools, one sports school, one music school, one boarding school, one sanative school, and a children creative works house.

Tomilino has a local newspaper with a free-of-charge distribution "Tomilinskaya Nov" (in Russian that mean "What's new in Tomilino").

The Local Government Board of Tomilino was elected in September 2005 for five years, and is represented by Igor Nickolayevich Dvornikov and his deputies.

== Twin cities ==
- Tomilino is twinned with Kvaisa (since 2007).
