= NPP Zvezda =

Aerospace company

JSC NPP Zvezda
- Founded: 1952
- Headquarters: Tomilino, Russia
- Products: Ejection seat Space suit Life support system Fire extinguisher Aircraft escape slides Lifejackets
- Parent: Technodinamika (Rostec)
- Website: www.zvezda-npp.ru

JSC Research & Development Production Enterprise Zvezda, or R&D PE Zvezda (Russian: Научно-производственное предприятие "Звезда", НПП Звезда, romanized: Nauchno-Proizvodstvennoye Predpriyatiye "Zvezda", NPP Zvezda, lit. "Star"), is a Russian manufacturer of life-support systems for high-altitude flight and human spaceflight. Its products include space suits, ejector seats, aircraft escape slides, lifejackets and fire extinguishers. It is based in Tomilino, near Moscow.

Guy Illich Severin was the General Director and General Designer of the company from 1964 to 2008. Sergey S. Pozdnyakov has been General Director since 2008.

== History ==
The organization was founded in 1952 to develop aviation pressure suits and in-flight refuelling systems for the USSR's space research programme. In the 1960s it began to design space suits, including the one worn by Yuri Gagarin. In 1965, a Berkut spacesuit was worn during the first spacewalk. The Orlan-M space suit was used by cosmonauts in the Mir space station. Zvezda became a joint-stock company in 1994.

== Products ==
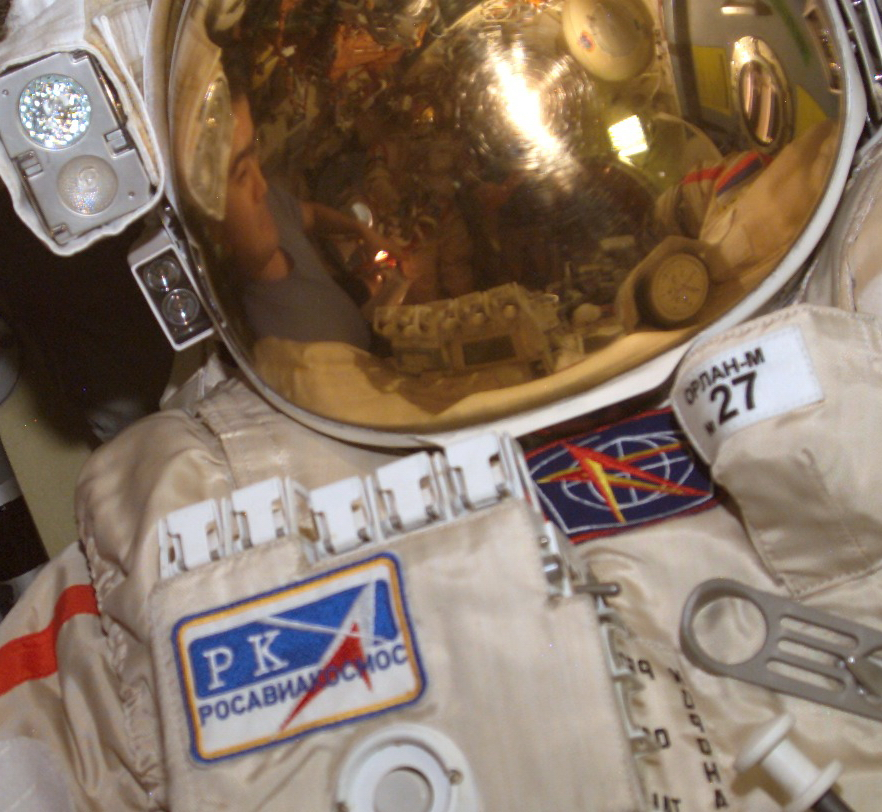
Zvezda's chevron logo on the Orlan space suit

Zvezda is also Russia's primary manufacturer of ejector seats for Russian fighter aircraft. The K-36 ejector seat was studied at length by the US Navy and Air Force; IBP Aircraft (currently UTC Aerospace Systems) opened up a factory in the US to manufacture it for the F-22 Raptor and the Joint Strike Fighter. The US government, however, selected the Martin-Baker seat from the United Kingdom for its new fighter jet.

For improved pilot survivability, the Russian Kamov Ka-50 "Black Shark" helicopter is fitted with a NPP Zvezda K-37-800 ejection seat, which is a rare feature for a helicopter. Before the rocket in the ejection seat kicks in, rotor blades are blown away by explosive charges in the rotor disc and the canopy is similarly jettisoned. Also, there is a special ejection seat made for L-39 known as K-93.

The company has patented a lightweight ejection seat for general aviation aircraft, such as SKS-94, KS-2012.

The company also designed a unique complex consisting of ejection seat K-36RB for Buran space vehicle. The system is designed to allow the evacuation of the Buran as the crew at takeoff and landing.

== List of directors ==
- 1952–1964 – SM Alekseev – responsible manager and chief designer of the plant.
- 1964–2008 – Guy Severin – General Director and General Designer.
- 2008–n. at. – S. Pozdnyakov – General Director and Chief Designer.
