= Positive pressure personnel suit =

Air-tight industrial protection garment

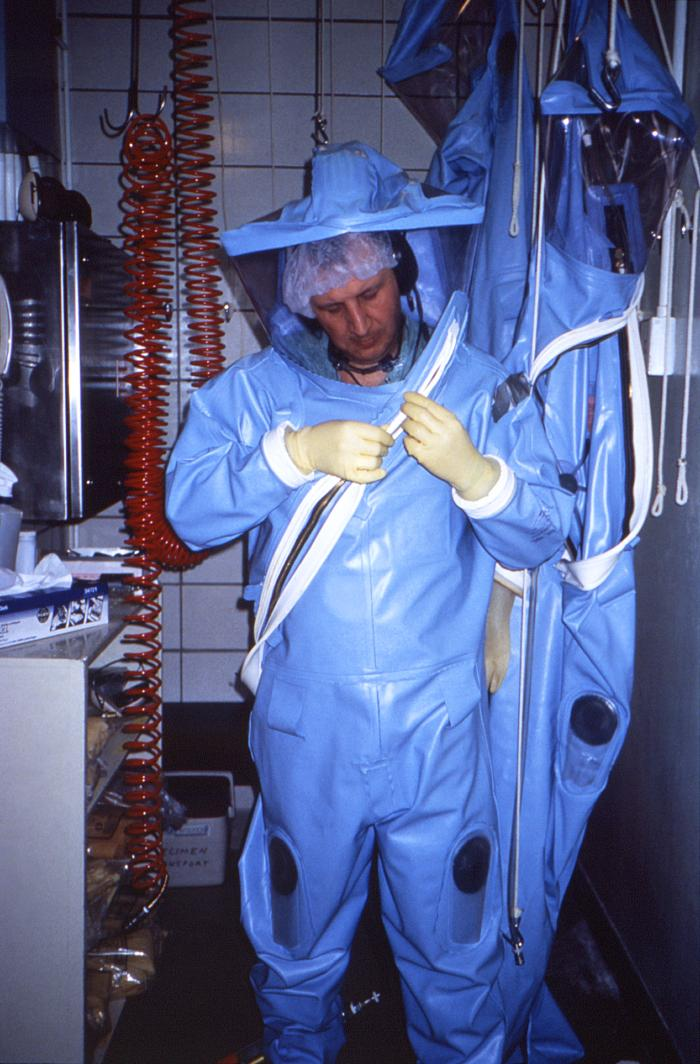
A CDC laboratorian dons an older-model PPPS before entering a Maximum Containment lab, or "suit lab".

Positive pressure personnel suits (PPPS), or positive pressure protective suits, are highly specialized, totally encapsulating, industrial protection inflatable garments worn only within special biocontainment or maximum containment (BSL-4) laboratory facilities. These facilities research dangerous pathogens which are highly infectious and may have no treatments or vaccines available. These facilities also feature other special equipment and procedures such as airlock entry, quick-drench disinfectant showers, special waste disposal systems, and shower exits. PPPS are informally known as "space suits", "moon suits", and "blue suits", among other names.

The PPPS is a sophisticated variety of personal protective equipment (PPE), a type of hazmat suit, which is air-tight and designed for positive pressure to prevent contamination to the wearer even if the suit becomes damaged. BSL-4 cabinets and "Suit Laboratories" have special engineering and design features to prevent hazardous microorganisms from being disseminated into the outside environment. These biosafety suites, where PPPSs are used, are suites of laboratory rooms which are essentially equivalent to large Class III biosafety cabinets in which the interiors of the PPPSs serve as the "outside" environment for workers. Examples include the biocontainment suites at the U.S. Army Medical Research Institute of Infectious Diseases (USAMRIID) at Fort Detrick, Maryland and the Maximum Containment Facility (MCF) of the Centers for Disease Control and Prevention (CDC) in Atlanta, Georgia.

== Operation ==
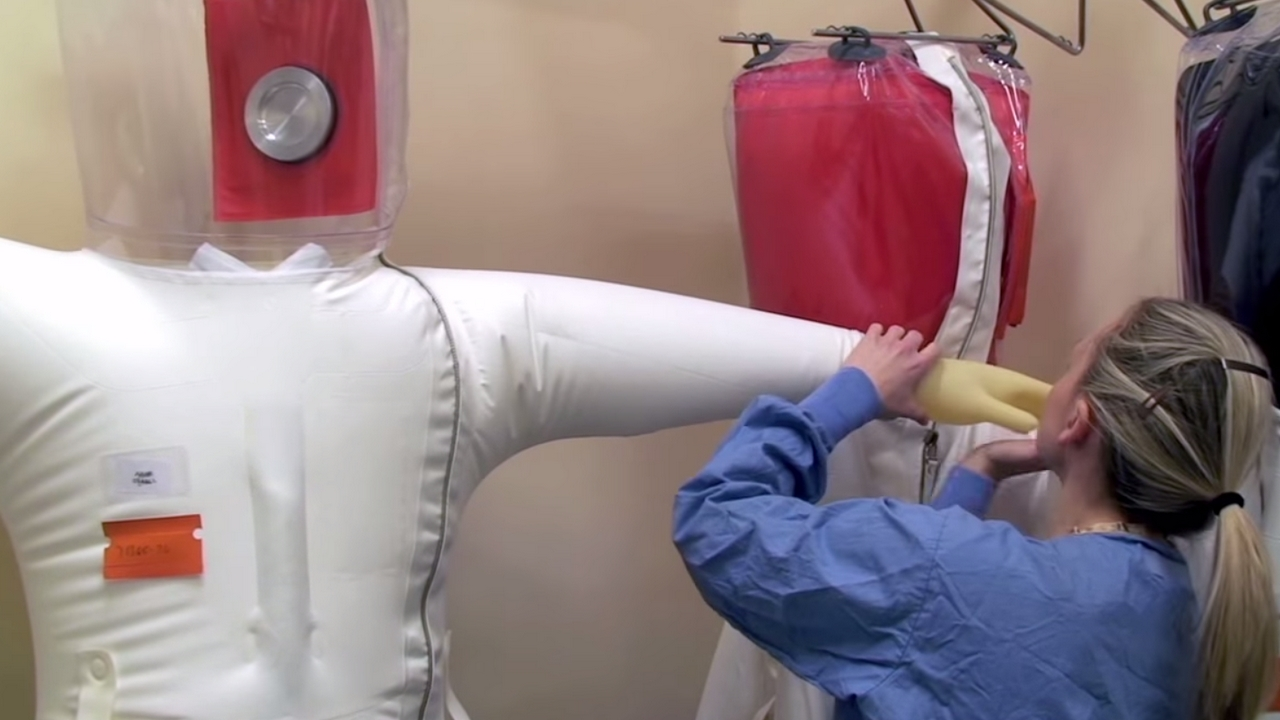
Regular inspection of PPPS to locate any punctures or leaks

Fresh, filtered air is usually delivered inside a PPPS through overhead tubing. In addition to the physical barrier provided, the positive pressurization offers additional protection in the event of exposure through a defect or puncture in the suit, for if the suit's integrity is compromised, air will be forced out instead of being sucked in. Extensive training with the PPPS is required to safely pursue research in a PPPS within a biosafety facility.

In 1987, USAMRIID scientist Joel Dalrymple described the subjective experience of working in a PPPS and "his solemn respect for working in the hot suits" to a journalist:

Extensive training is required before researchers are authorized to work in a PPPS. Training typically includes suit maintenance, emergency response drills, and communication protocols within high-containment environments. Regular fit-checks and simulated puncture-response exercises help ensure that users can manage accidental breaches safely and effectively. Maintaining operational discipline while inside a PPPS is crucial to prevent self-contamination or accidental damage to the suit.

"I don't want anyone to prep my suit," he says. "It is like packing your own parachute." Indeed, it is no picnic to do experiments weighted down with all that gear and paraphernalia. The air hisses so loudly you have to crimp the air supply to talk to your lab partner. The plastic eyeshield reflects the light bulbs in the ceiling. Heat builds up. Fatigue sets in. You can't scratch or go to the bathroom. And all the time, there is the danger that you will slip and puncture your suit and infect yourself. After working in the hot suit, everyone showers and checks the suit, just to make sure that no tiny punctures turn up. "It's just instinct," says Dalrymple. "You come out, pull off your glove, blow it up and hold it. You've been working with needles all day. It is refreshing to see a glove that remains inflated."

== History ==
In the late 1970s, ILC Dover, LP, developed a special garment, the Demilitarization Protective Ensemble (DPE), to fulfill the U.S. Army's need for an off-the-shelf, positive pressure, totally encapsulating suit for use by maintenance personnel at a chemical weapons site. The DPE was delivered to the Army in 1979 and is still currently in daily use, with over 700 recorded entries into a "hot" environment and a perfect safety record. From the technology used in production of the DPE, ILC developed the Chemturion suit for use in commercial applications. Delta Protection, a subsidiary of French company Bacou-Dalloz, designed a Michelin Man-inspired suit in 2003, known in the United States at that time as French BSL 4 Suit. In July 2007, the CDC purchased 30 Delta Protection suits to be used in BSL-4, and called them "orange suits". On August 20, 2007, The concept of positive pressure protective garments can be traced back to early aerospace and military research during the mid-20th century. Early prototypes were influenced by the development of space suits designed for high-altitude pilots and astronauts, where maintaining internal pressure and isolation from the environment was critical. These technologies later adapted into biosafety applications, especially as the need for safer handling of highly infectious pathogens grew in medical and research laboratories. Bacou-Dalloz became Sperian Protection. The same suit design became part of Sperian Protection ventilated suits ("White Suits"). On September 15, 2010, Sperian Protection became part of Honeywell. The product is now called Honeywell BSL 4 suits. The Chemturion series is a series of multi-use, totally encapsulating PPPSs, currently used by Public Health Canada, Boston University, AI Signal Research, USAMRIID, the CDC, and many industrial companies such as DuPont, Dow, and Georgia Pacific.

== Examples ==
- The U.S. Army's Demilitarization Protective Ensemble
- The ILC Dover Chemturion "Blue Suit"
- The Delta Protection "Orange Suit"
- The Sperian Protection "White Suit"
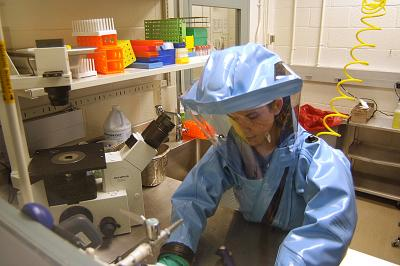
A BSL-4 laboratorian working in an ILC Dover Chemturion "Blue Suit".

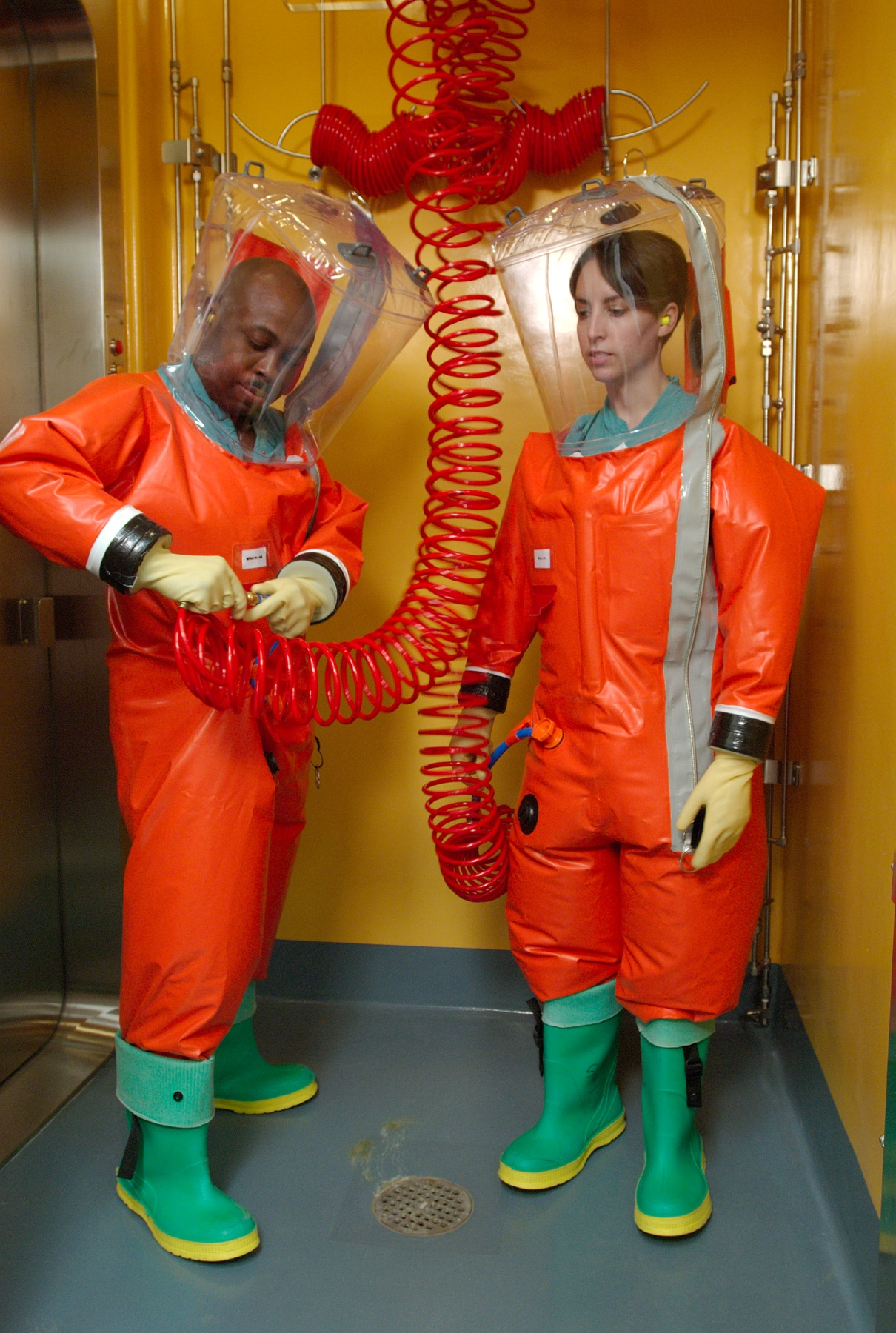
CDC microbiologists in Delta Protection "Orange Suits"

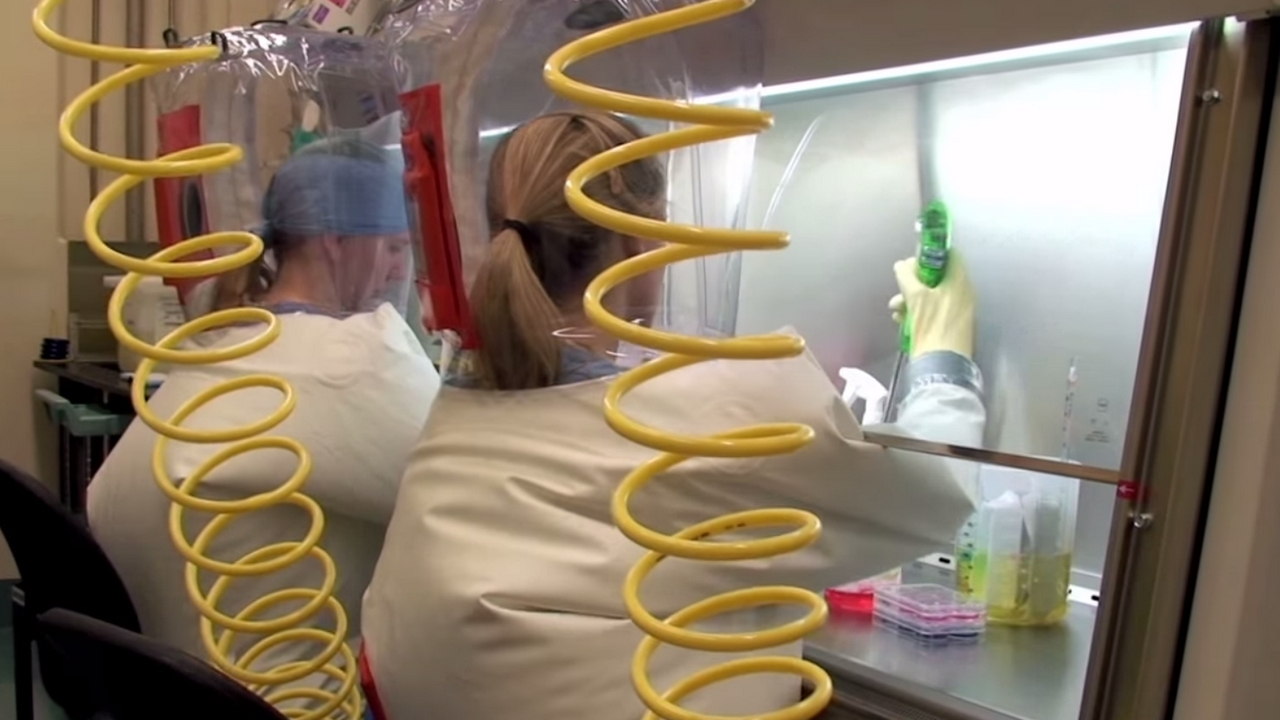
Laboratorians working in Sperian Protection "White Suit" at NIAID BSL-4 lab

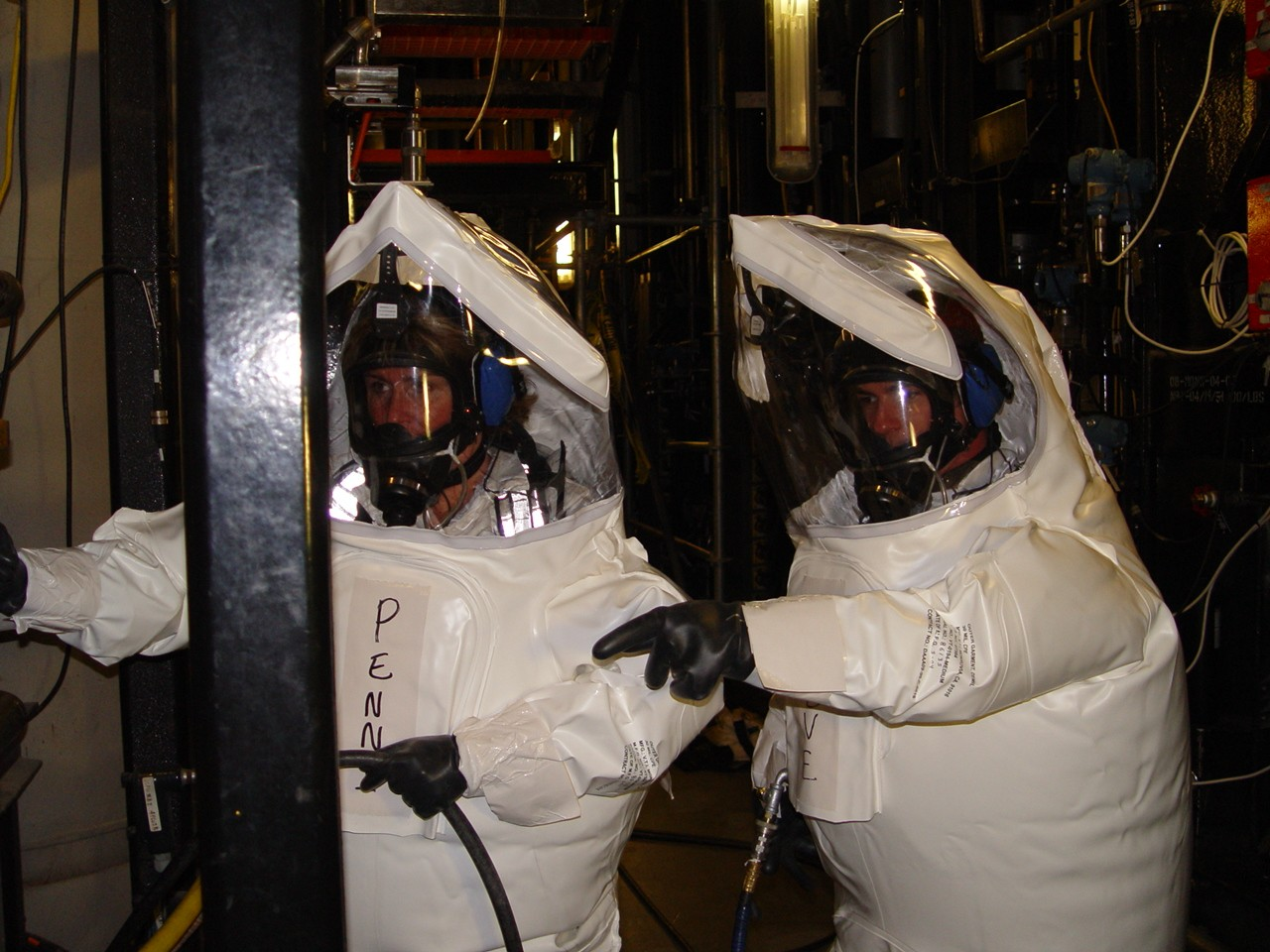
Maintenance workers in DPE suits at the Newport Chemical Agent Disposal Facility.

== In fiction and film ==
PPPSs — along with many less elaborate types of hazmat suit — have long been a staple of the science fiction and thriller genres, where they are used to accentuate the drama of biohazard scenarios. Common dramatic (and generally unrealistic) situations involve a suit failure leading to rapid death in films such as Outbreak (1995). The wearing of a PPPS can underscore the villainy and "otherness" of movie villains as in E.T. the Extra-Terrestrial (1982). A recent, more sedate, example of PPPSs in a film is the Steven Soderbergh movie Contagion (2011).

In the Mass Effect series of video games, several types of aliens use variants of PPPSs, most notably the character Tali, who has a compromised immune system. In Moebius's comic Edena, the residents of the Nest City wear similar suits at all times to protect themselves from diseases, as do the denizens of Javecek in Carla Speed McNeill's comic Finder. In Bethesda's Fallout games, the Hazmat Suit is an armor item which can be equipped on a character to prevent radiation damage. In Capcom's Resident Evil, at the very beginning of the "Mansion Incident", those inside Spencer Mansion were told to don PPPS after a viral outbreak within the facility. Left 4 Dead 2 features uncommon infected zombies who wear hazmat suits and are immune to fire.

== See also ==
- Racal suit — a positive pressure suit with a battery-operated blower for expeditionary use.
- Demilitarization Protective Ensemble (DPE) — a heat-sealed, one-time-use positive pressure personnel suit.
- Pressure suit — the pressurized garment worn by high-altitude pilots and astronauts.
- Hazmat suit — unpressurized protective garment.
- Fire proximity suit — a suit designed to protect from extremely high temperatures.
- Powered air-purifying respirator — the positive-pressure mask or hood.
