= Desert Research and Technology Studies =

Field trials of technologies for crewed planetary exploration

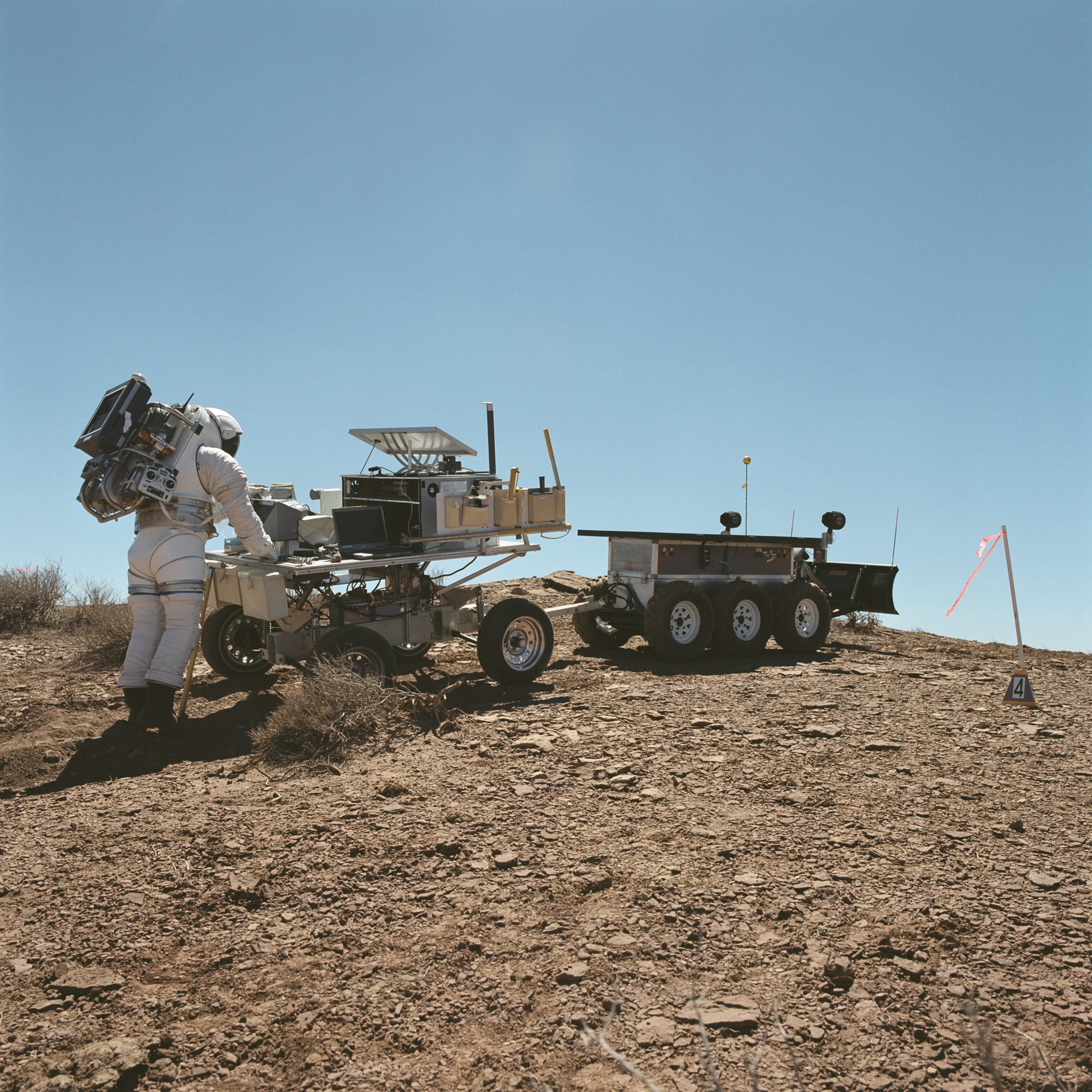
Test subject Dean Eppler, working at the rear of a science trailer during Desert RATS 2004

NASA's Desert Research and Technology Studies (Desert RATS or D-RATS) is a group of teams which perform an annual series of field trials seeking to demonstrate and test candidate technologies and systems for human exploration of the surface of the Moon, Mars, or other rocky bodies.

Desert RATS began in 1997, reviving Apollo-style lunar exploration training from decades earlier. The field season takes place for around two weeks each year, usually in September, in planned locations surrounding Flagstaff, Arizona. Some tests have also been conducted near Meteor Crater. These activities are designed to exercise prototype planetary surface hardware and representative mission scenario operations in relatively harsh climatic conditions where long distance, multi-day traversing activities are achievable.

== Participants ==
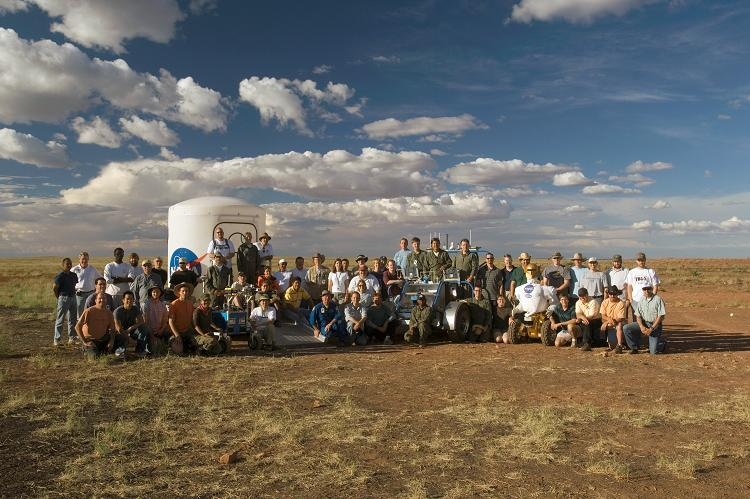
A portion of the 2006 Desert RATS field team

The participants in Desert RATS vary from year to year. Past participants have included researchers from various NASA centers, including Johnson Space Center, Kennedy Space Center, Goddard Space Flight Center, Ames Research Center, Glenn Research Center, Langley Research Center, the Jet Propulsion Laboratory and Marshall Space Flight Center, as well as contractors Hamilton Sundstrand and ILC Dover, and researchers from numerous universities and institutes, including the Carnegie Institute, the Universities Space Research Association, and Virginia Commonwealth University.

In 2010, there were about 200 scientists, engineers, and mission planners participating. Mission support is provided by the Mission Operations Exploration Planning and Operations Center (ExPOC) in Houston.

== Education and public outreach ==
Through live videoconferencing with NASA Explorer Schools and simultaneous webcasts, students around the world are able to watch Desert RATS activities live. The public is also encouraged to follow along through various social media means, including Facebook, Twitter, Flickr, and Ustream.

== Technologies tested ==
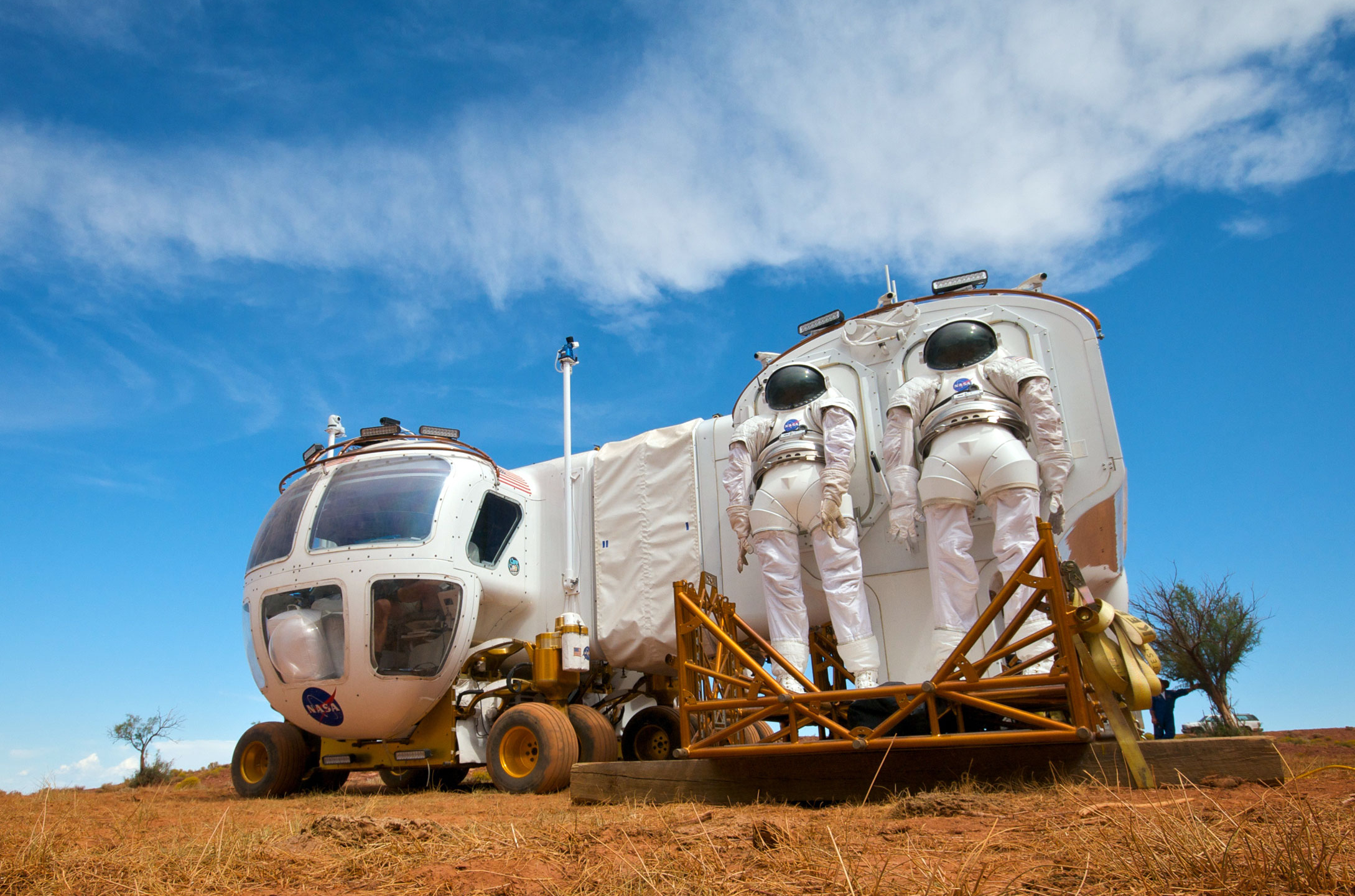
D-RATS test of Mars equipment, including suitports

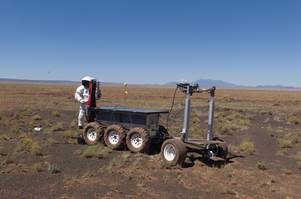
NASA PEGS Desert RATS 2004

During the trials, researchers study the effectiveness of new designs for space suits, robots, rovers, surface networking and communications, exploration information systems and computing, habitats, and other equipment, and gain experience in the use of new technologies designed to make planetary exploration safer, easier, and more efficient. Recent tests have involved the use of an interplanetary delay emulator developed at NASA. They stage mock explorations of the desert, and try out various procedures and techniques for accomplishing the mission. Suited crew members work side by side with robots, and are connected to one another and to the robots by a wireless network. The rugged terrain provides challenges for robotic navigation.

In 2005, the Science Crew Operations and Utility Testbed (SCOUT) rover was tested, working alongside two suited crew members. SCOUT could also be manually driven by the crew members. Other robots participating in D-RATS have included a six-legged all-terrain vehicle known as ATHLETE, the centaur-like Robonaut, and Matilda, an autonomous support vehicle capable of collecting geologic samples and aiding with path planning.

Space suits tested during Desert RATS include ILC Dover's Mark III and I-Suit. Using speech recognition built into their suits, mock astronauts can command robots, adjust suit parameters for comfort, and inquire into the mission status, or the status or location of any crew member or robot. A head-up display inside the suit can show this information as well. In 2005, participants tested a new system for refilling crew members' liquid-air tanks while in use, thus extending in-suit time.

At D-RATS 2004 technology demonstrated included the: Spacesuits, Matilda (autonomous robotic support vehicle), an electric tractor, mobile geology lab, a wireless network and other.

At D-RATS 2005 technology demonstrated included the: Spacesuits, SCOUT (Science, Crew, Operations and Utility Testbed) Rover, a system to recharge air tanks while they're in use and other.

At D-RATS 2006 technology demonstrated included the: ATHLETE, Robonaut/Centaur, Pressurized Rover Compartment, SCOUT Rover, electric tractor and other.

At D-RATS 2007 technology demonstrated included the: Spacesuits, SCOUT rover and other.

At D-RATS 2008 technology demonstrated included the: Space Exploration Vehicle, CHARIOT, spacesuits, ATHLETE and other.

At D-RATS 2009 technology demonstrated included the: Space Exploration Vehicle (including Chassis B), Tri-ATHLETE, spacesuits, K-10 robots and other.

At D-RATS 2010 technology demonstrated included the: Space Exploration Vehicle, Habitat Demonstration Unit/Pressurized Excursion Module - including Geolab, Tri-ATHLETE, Centaur 2, Portable Utility Pallets, Portable Communication Terminal Concept and other. In addition, operational concepts explored included understanding the differences in productivity for crew operations and ground support with continuous communication vs. twice-a-day communication and evaluating and comparing two-rover operations in a lead-and-trail mode vs. a divide-and conquer mode.

== Planetary Exploration Geophysical Systems (PEGS) ==
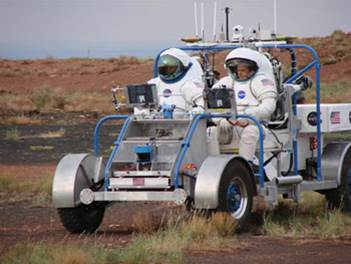
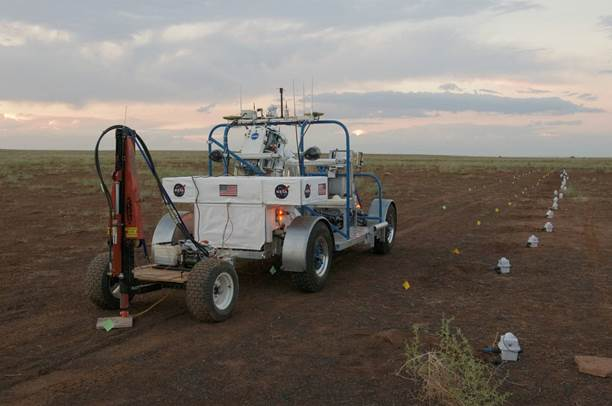
NASA PEGS Desert RATS 2006

Initiated in 2004, the goal of PEGS is to develop guidelines for seismic hardware suitable for Lunar and Martian exploration. The system must have minimal volume and mass, be self-powered and recharging, wireless and suitable for planetary exploration and astronaut training. The system must be consistent with NASA's exploration vision in which seismic and other geophysical systems will be key elements of planetary exploration, sub-surface assessments and resource development. The system was tested in Barringer Crater in 2004, 2005 and 2006 plus the McMurdo Dry Valleys of Antarctica in 2005. Useful reflection records were recorded in Arizona and the refraction survey recorded in Antarctica was used to determine the thickness of the valley fill.

== 2011 test ==
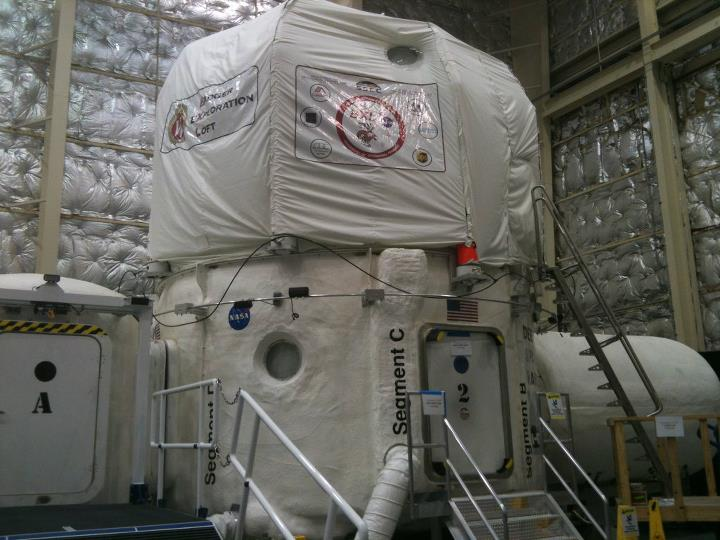
The Deep Space Habitat/Habitat Demonstration Unit (DSH/HDU).

In late August/Early Sept 2011 D-RATS made their 14th trip to the Arizona Desert to continue testing the technology NASA will need to enable multiple destinations for future human exploration including the Moon, near-Earth asteroids (NEAs), Mars moons, and ultimately the surface of Mars. The team continued testing hardware including the Space Exploration Vehicle (SEV), the Habitat Demonstration Unit (HDU), and the Centaur Robotic assistant vehicle system.

As part of the eXploration Habitat (X-Hab) Academic Innovation Challenge, an attachable inflatable habitat "Loft" designed and built by undergraduate students at the University of Wisconsin–Madison will be joined to the HDU and provide crew quarters for the astronaut/geologist crews.

One of the operational concepts that were explored in the 2011 field season was the effect of communication time delays. This is not a major challenge for lunar explorers as the time lag is only a couple of seconds, but at a near-Earth asteroid the time lag might be a minute or more, making normal conversation impossible. At Mars, it is much worse, the lag can be up to 20 minutes each way. Effective strategies for communicating under these conditions include utilizing text messaging, specific voice protocols, and a relay crew member that is not participating in the EVA.

== 2012 test ==
The 2012 Desert RATS field tests did not involve either a desert, or a field; rather, they were conducted in JSC's Building 9, the Space Vehicle Mockup Facility. The tools and simulators were configured and optimized for a simulated mission to a near-Earth asteroid. A virtual reality lab provided an immersive environment for the extravehicular activity (EVA) crewmembers, integrating real-time graphics with crewmember motions and kinesthetic sensations of large objects – an asteroid in this case. The Active Response Gravity Offload System (ARGOS), a crane-based, reduced-gravity system, allowed crews to conduct EVAs in simulated microgravity.

== Image gallery ==
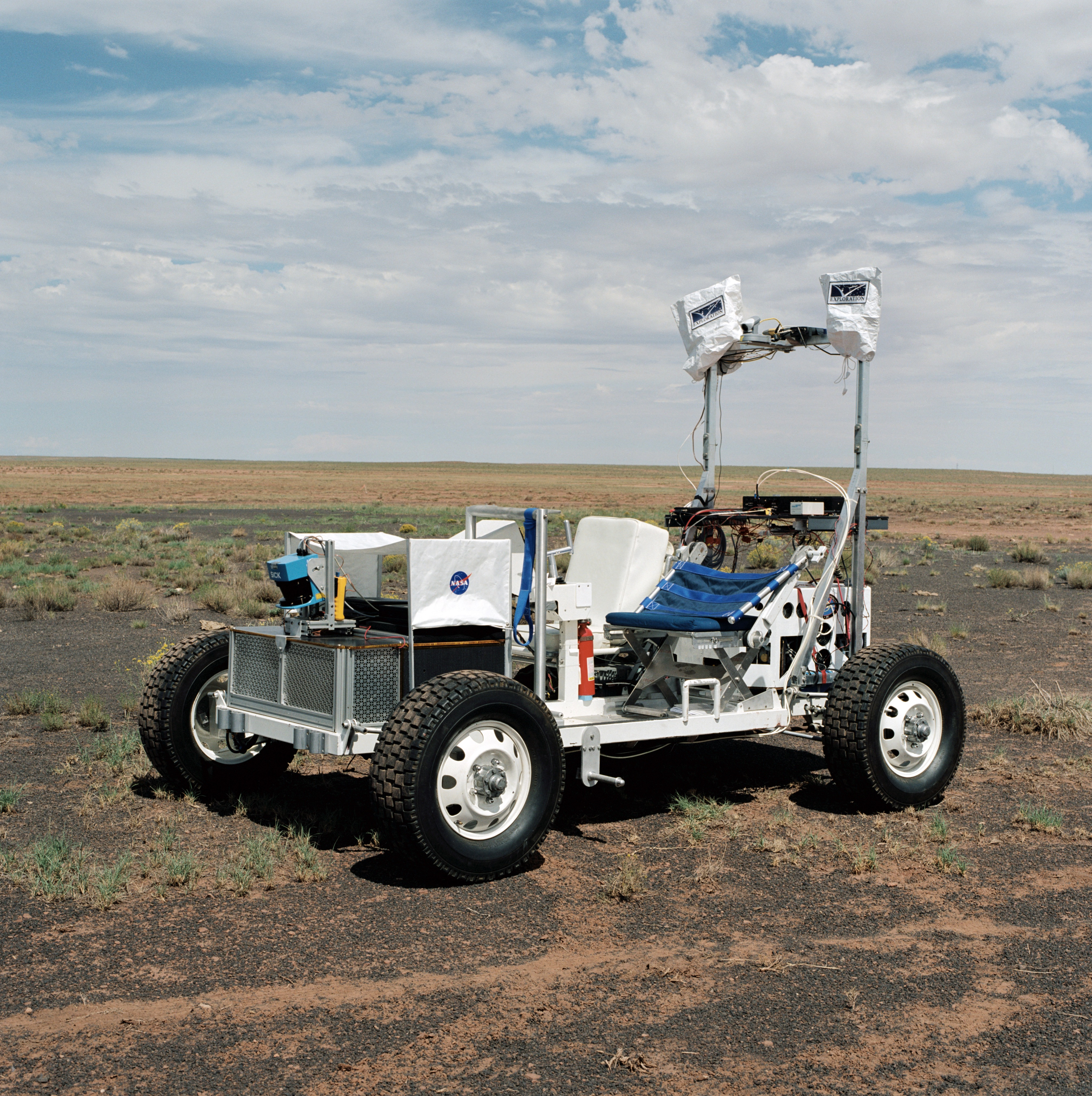
SCOUT Rover

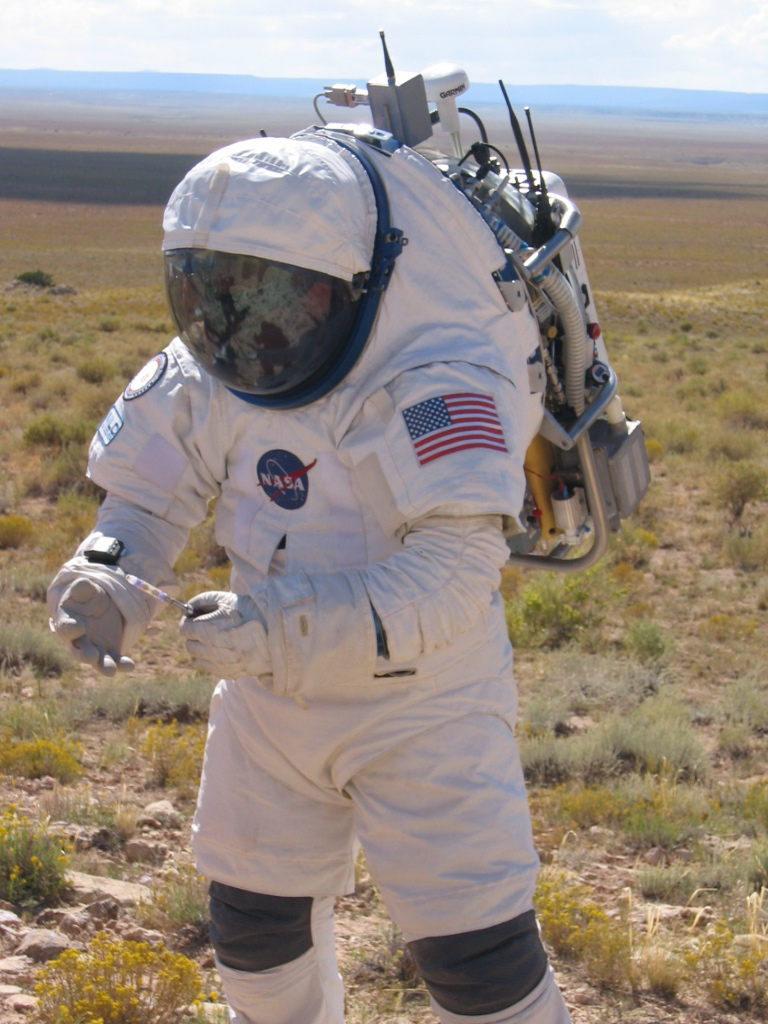
I-suit

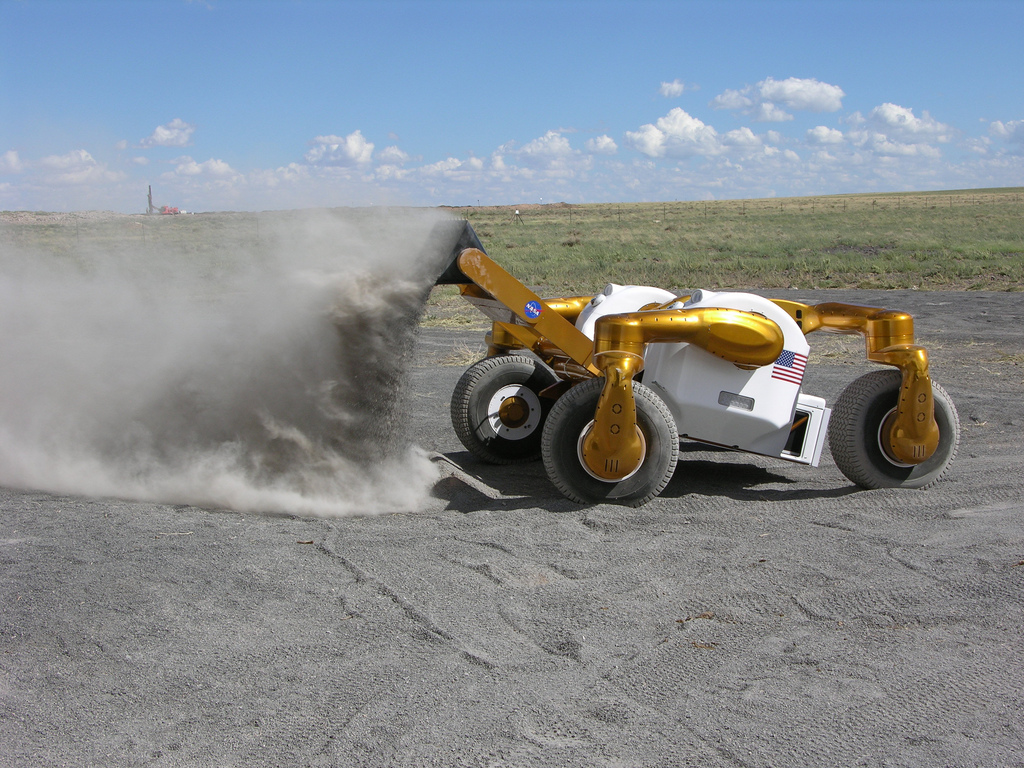
Centaur 2

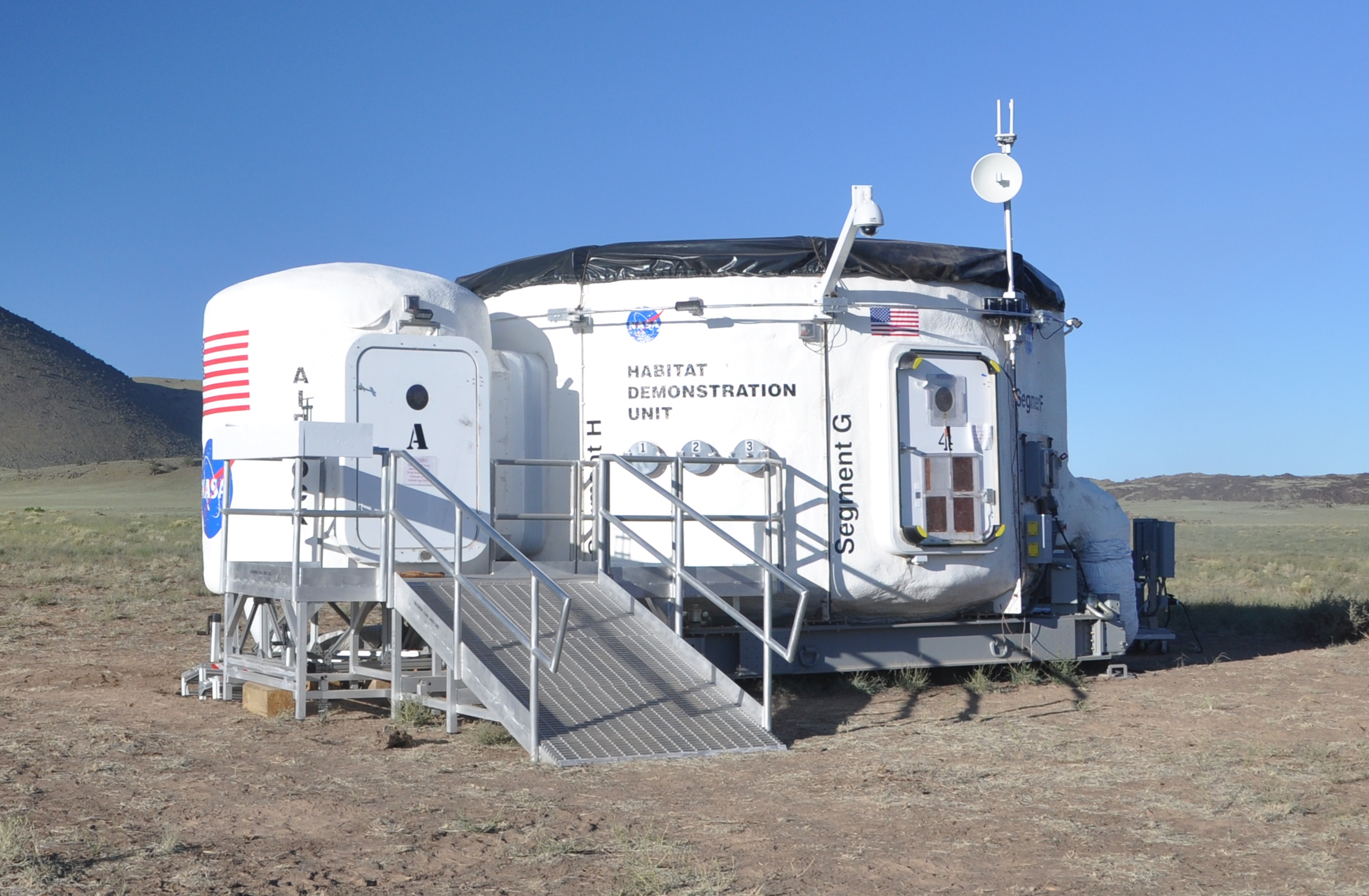
Habitat Demonstration Unit

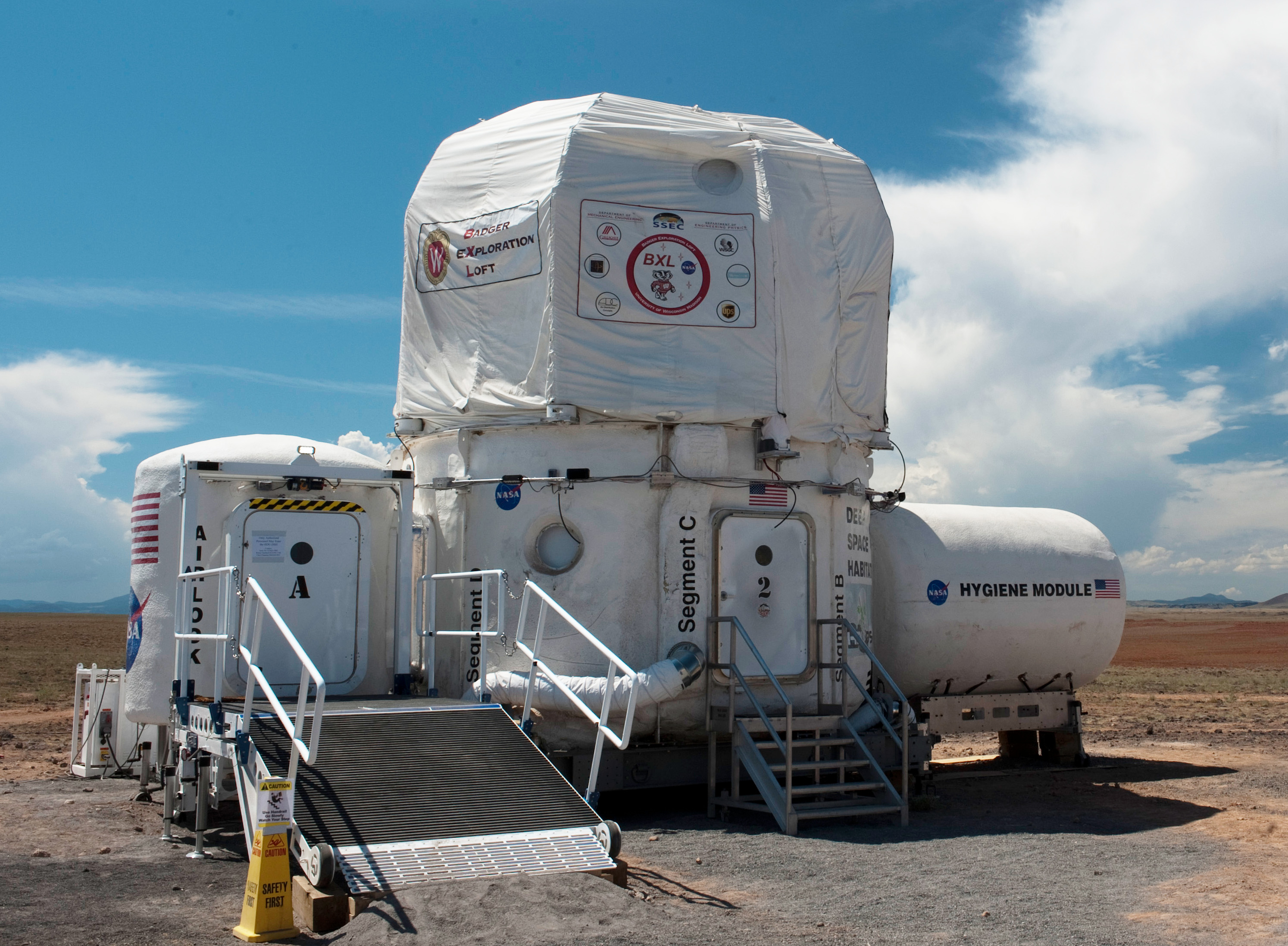
Habitat Demonstration Unit with X-Hab

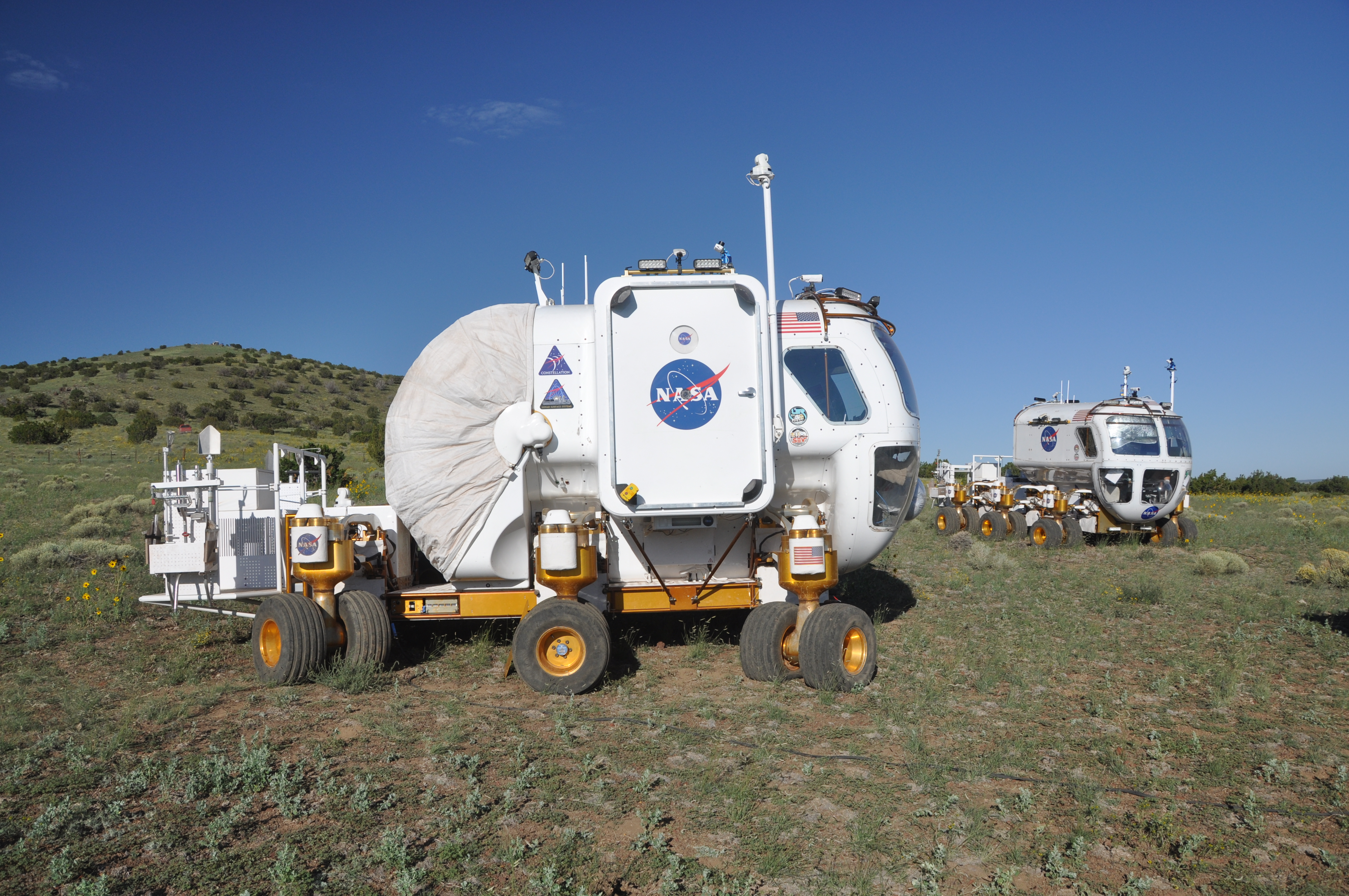
Space Exploration Vehicle

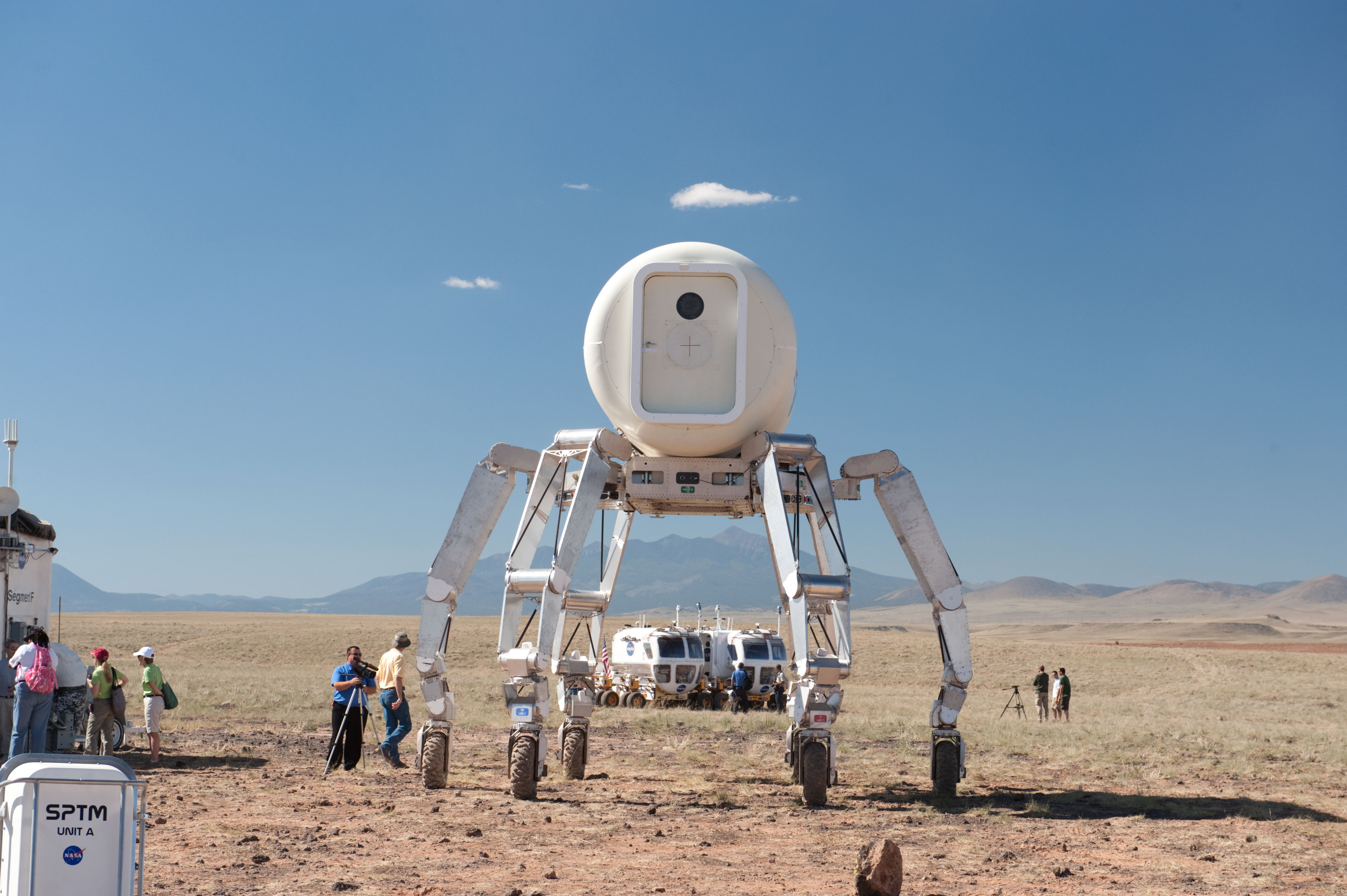
Tri-ATHLETE

== See also ==
- Exploration of Mars
- Human spaceflight
