= D-RATS =

D-RATS may refer to:

- Desert Research and Technology Studies, teams that study systems for human exploration of the surface of the Moon or other rocky bodies
- D-RATS, an emergency communication tool based on the D-STAR digital communication protocol for amateur radio operators
