= DPE =

DPE may refer for:

== Organizations ==
- Department for Professional Employees, AFL-CIO, a US trade union body
- Department of Planning & Environment, New South Wales, Australia
- Department of Public Enterprises, South Africa
- Dis Politika Enstitüsü, a Turkish think tank

== Science and technology ==
- Demilitarization Protective Ensemble, a disposable suit for handling chemical weapons
- Development, Printing, Enlargement, or film processing
- Downstream promoter element, in genetics
- Dynamic programming equation, in mathematical optimization

== Other uses ==
- Decriminalised Parking Enforcement, in UK law
- Designated Pilot Examiner, a person certified by FAA to conduct pilot rating
