= Mark III (space suit) =

Space suit technology demonstrator

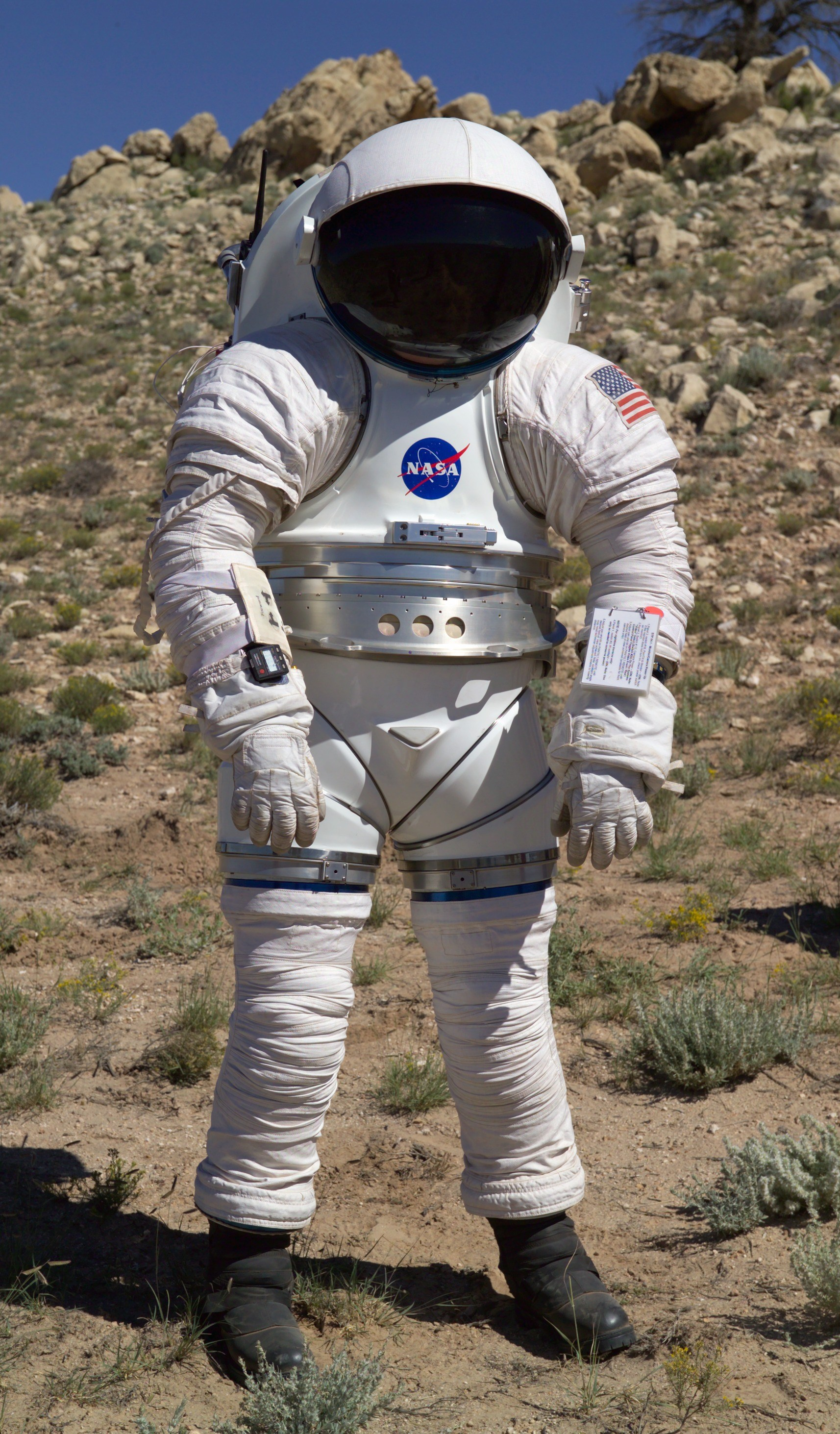
The Mark III suit worn by NASA geologist Dean Eppler during field testing at Meteor Crater near Winslow, Arizona, US

The Mark III or MK III (H-1) is a NASA space suit technology demonstrator built by ILC Dover. While heavier than other suits (at 59 kilograms (130 lb), with a 15 kilograms (33 lb) Primary Life Support System backpack), the Mark III is more mobile, and is designed for a relatively high operating pressure.

The Mark III is a rear-entry suit, unlike the EMU currently in use, which is a waist-entry suit. The suit incorporates a mix of hard and soft suit components, including hard upper torso, hard lower torso and hip elements made of graphite/epoxy composite, bearings at the shoulder, upper arm, hip, waist, and ankle, and soft fabric joints at the elbow, knee, and ankle.

The Mark III was originally designed to an 8.3 pounds per square inch (57 kPa) operating pressure, which would make the Mark III a "zero-prebreathe" suit. For a vehicle with a one atmosphere, mixed-gas environment, such as that on the International Space Station, the suit could be donned and ready for an EVA within the normal donning and checkout period without risk of the bends, which can occur with rapid depressurization from an atmosphere containing nitrogen or another inert gas. Currently, ISS astronauts must spend several hours in a reduced pressure, pure oxygen environment before EVA to avoid these risks.

== Testing ==
The Mark III, as well as ILC's I-Suit, has been involved in field testing during NASA's annual Desert Research and Technology Studies (D-RATS) field trials, during which suit occupants interact with one another, and with rovers and other equipment.

Subjects wearing the Mark III were able to kneel to pick up objects, a task which would be difficult in either the Apollo A7L or Shuttle EMU suit. Dean Eppler, a geologist at NASA's Johnson Space Center who wore the suit during testing, commented that "the Mark III in many cases has almost shirtsleeve-equivalent mobility." Eppler has spent more than 100 hours in the Mark III.

As a result of the success of zero- and partial-gravity testing on the KC-135 Vomit Comet and in 1g field tests in Arizona and at Johnson Space Center, the EVA Project Office at Johnson Space Center is currently looking toward a soft suit design for future astronauts that incorporates the enhanced mobility features of the Mark III, but with a lower weight penalty. This new pressure garment design will provide greater surface mobility for planetary surface exploration than was available with the Apollo Program A7L and A7LB pressure garments.
