= Chemturion =

Personal protective suit manufactured by ILC Dover

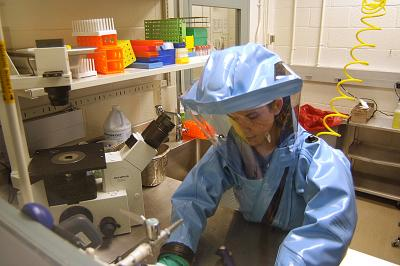
Medical researcher wearing a Chemturion suit

The Chemturion is a multi-use, positive pressure totally encapsulating protective suit, manufactured by ILC Dover. It is currently used by Public Health Canada, Boston University, USAMRIID and AI Signal Research, the Center for Disease Control in Atlanta, and many industrial companies such as DuPont, Dow, and Georgia Pacific.

The Chemturion is based on technology developed by ILC Dover as part of the development of the Demilitarization Protective Ensemble, a one-piece disposable suit used in chemical weapons disposal.

The Chemturion is commonly used in biohazard environments, including BSL4 environments, and is sometimes known as the "blue suit" because of its colour. Other suits used in BSL4 environments include Honeywell Safety's Delta suits, and HVO suits manufactured by HVO-ISSI-Deutschland GmbH.

== See also ==
- Racal suit, also known as the "orange suit"
