= I-Suit =

American spacesuit

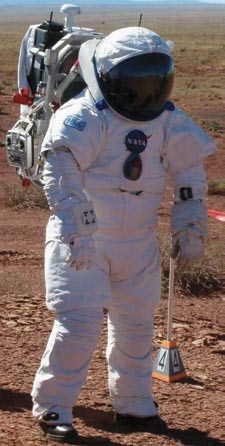
The I-suit during field trials at the 2004 Desert RATS

The I-Suit is a spacesuit model constructed by ILC Dover. The suit began as an EVA mobility demonstrator, developed to meet a contract awarded by NASA to ILC in 1997 for an all-soft suit.

The I-Suit is designed for multiple roles, including planetary excursion and microgravity EVA. The first generation I-Suit is configured to work with the existing Space Shuttle EMU helmet assembly and wrist bearing/disconnect, and incorporates a 2-bearing hip, hard waist entry, and walking boots. The suit meets requirements imposed by NASA for pressure, structural loads, joint mobility (torque and range of motion), and resizing capability.

== Improvements over EMU ==
The I-Suit incorporates improvements in materials and manufacturing techniques which make it both lighter and more mobile than the EMU.

While the EMU is solely intended for the microgravity environment, where weight is not an issue, the I-Suit's planetary role makes weight a critical factor. By replacing the EMU's fiberglass Hard Upper Torso (HUT) section with a soft upper torso, or SUT, and by using lightweight titanium in place of stainless steel for load-bearing metal components, the I-suit weighs only 65 pounds (29 kg) without its life support backpack or thermal/micrometeoroid layer, compared to 107 pounds (49 kg) for the EMU. The suit also features a graphite-epoxy shoulder bearing housing, demonstrating the use of this material in place of aluminum. Replacing all the suit's bearing housings with graphite-epoxy would save a further ten pounds (4.5 kg).

Joint torque in fabric spacesuits is minimized by the careful placement of gores, convolutes, and pleats into the fabric structure. Improvements in joint torque in the I-Suit are primarily the result of refinement of these techniques, rather than the result of new technologies, though the suit does incorporate Vectran in its restraint cords, which has somewhat improved thermal properties over the Spectra used in shuttle suits.

== Versions ==
After the original I-Suit was delivered to NASA, improvements to the design were incorporated into a second generation suit, including a new helmet with improved visibility range, a redesigned hip/thigh joint, and improved boots and waist hardware. The second generation I-suit incorporates a rear-entry hatch.

Technologies evaluated with the second generation suit include electronic textiles for use as buttons incorporated into the suit, a heads-up display, GPS capability, and speech recognition software to allow the suit occupant to receive information from the suit and external hardware.

The I-Suit, as well as ILC's Mark III suit, has been involved in field testing during NASA's annual Desert Research and Technology Studies (D-RATS) field trials, during which suit occupants interact with one another, and with rovers and other equipment.

Generation I (1997–1998)

Generation 2 (2000–2005)

Generation 3 (2005–present)
