= ATHLETE =

Proposed lunar rover

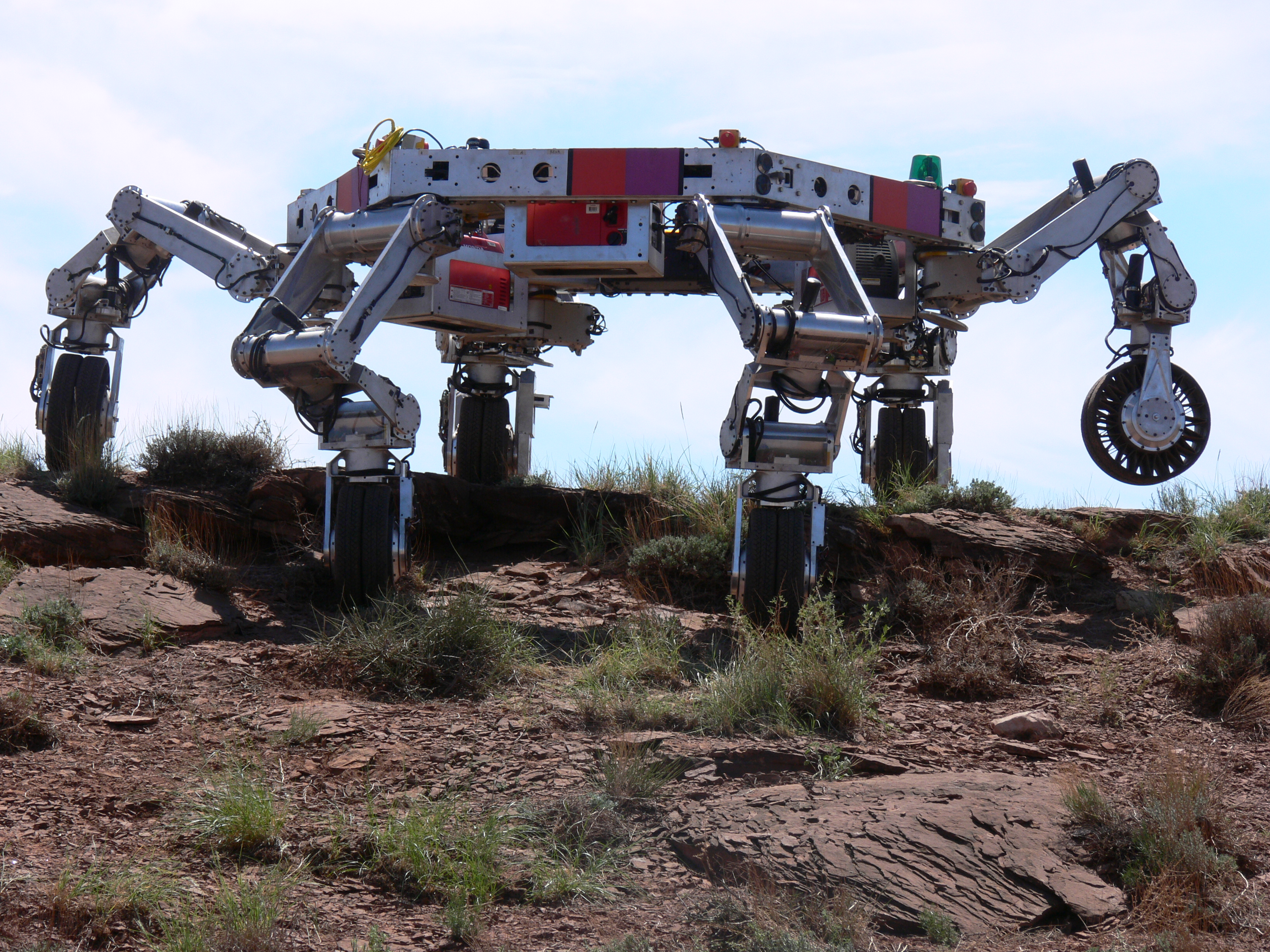
ATHLETE with Tweel wheels, climbing a hill

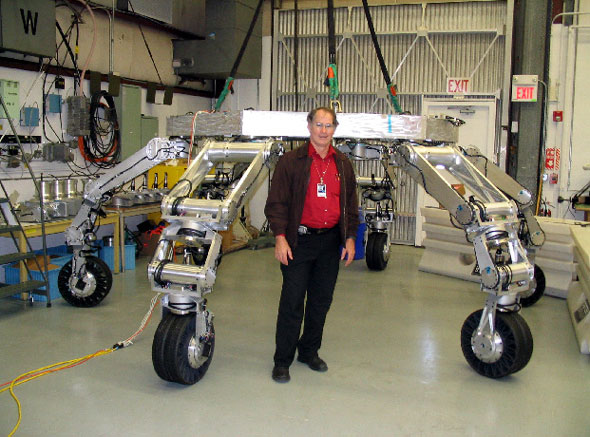
Quarter-scale ATHLETE prototype, with its principal investigator Brian Wilcox

ATHLETE (All-Terrain Hex-Limbed Extra-Terrestrial Explorer) is a six-legged robotic lunar rover under development by the Jet Propulsion Laboratory (JPL). ATHLETE is a testbed for systems, and is designed for use on the Moon.

The system is in development along with NASA's Johnson and Ames Centers, Stanford University and Boeing. ATHLETE is designed, for maximum efficiency, to be able to both roll and walk over a wide range of terrains.

== Systems ==
The project aims to develop a multi-purpose system capable of docking or mating with special-purpose devices including refueling stations, excavation implements and/or special end effectors. The legs have six degrees of freedom (6-DOF) for generalized robotic manipulation. Each ATHLETE is intended to have a payload capacity of 450 kilograms (990 lb), in Earth's gravity with the capability of docking multiple ATHLETE vehicles together to support larger loads.

The ATHLETE is much larger than robotic systems previously used and has a diameter of around 4 metres (13 ft) and a reach of around 6 metres (20 ft). Even with this larger size the project has allowed the facility for multiple units to be stowed and docked compactly for launch into an annular ring. This would mean that many vehicles can be efficiently stacked around a main payload on a single lander.

The six 6-DOF legs allow more capabilities than other robotic systems such as Sojourner or the Mars Exploration Rovers. These mean that the slopes it could climb would be up to 35° on solid surfaces and 25° on soft surfaces, such as the soft deposits of dust found on the Moon. Plans are to develop the system's capability of travel over rougher terrain and to increase the speed of ATHLETE to 10 kilometres (6.2 mi) per hour, 100 times faster than the Spirit and Opportunity rovers.

== Goals ==
The JPL is aiming for a 10-year life span, and the capability for re-usable delivery vehicles would mean that the goal of "an affordable lunar-surface flight experiment that demonstrates this technology on the Moon and subsequently uses it as part of the Human Lunar Return campaign to perform the needed robotic or human vehicle functions on the lunar surface."

ATHLETE's purpose is to support lunar exploration operations. One hypothetical mission scenario features a mobile, crewed "base" supported by ATHLETEs capable of traversing thousands of kilometers and setting down temporarily to study interesting features along the way.

== Future improvements ==
Planning for the future of the ATHLETE includes the ability to scale difficult obstacles by means of employing a launchable/releasable grappling hook and line which it will use to haul itself up even vertical slopes. There are also plans to introduce provisions for voice and gesture commands from suited astronauts in proximity to the ATHLETE, the ability to self-deploy from their storage facilities and the capability for "autonomous footfall placement". Work was also done to adapt the Tweel technology for use with the rover.

== Gallery ==
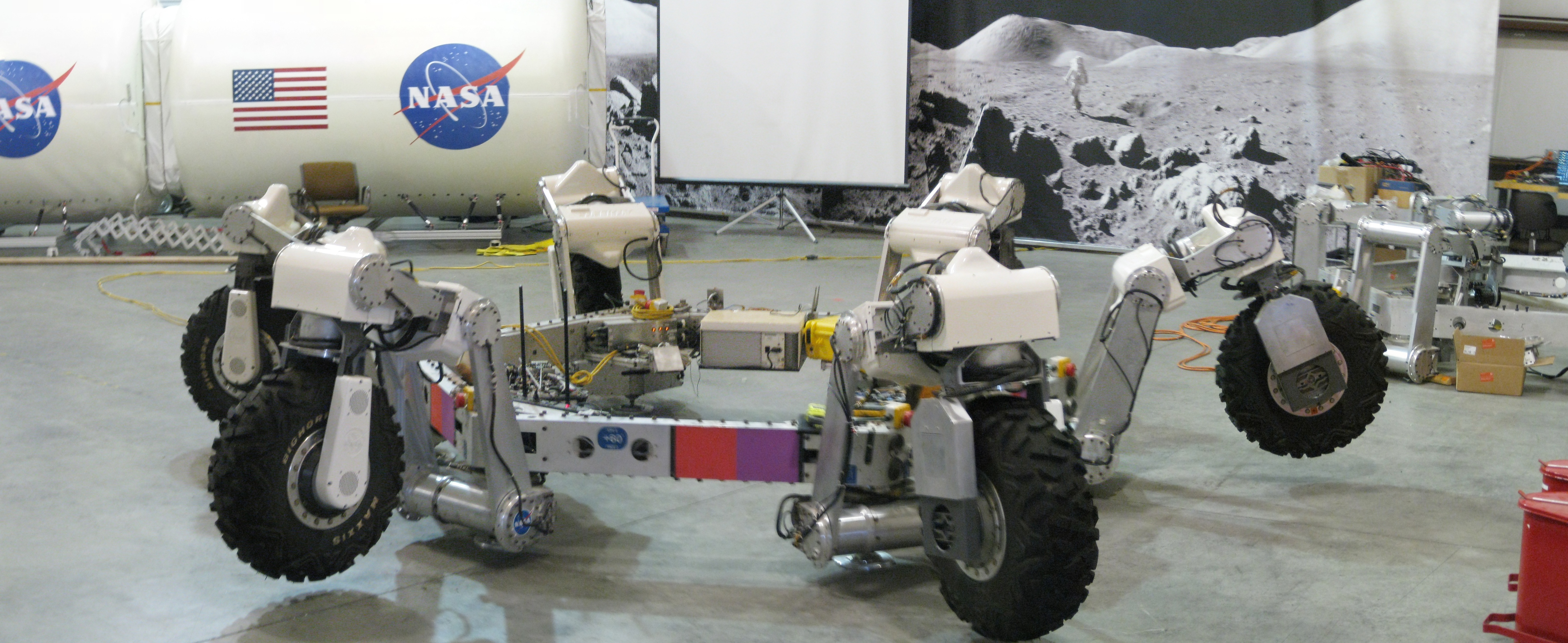
The ATHLETE rover in a test facility at JPL

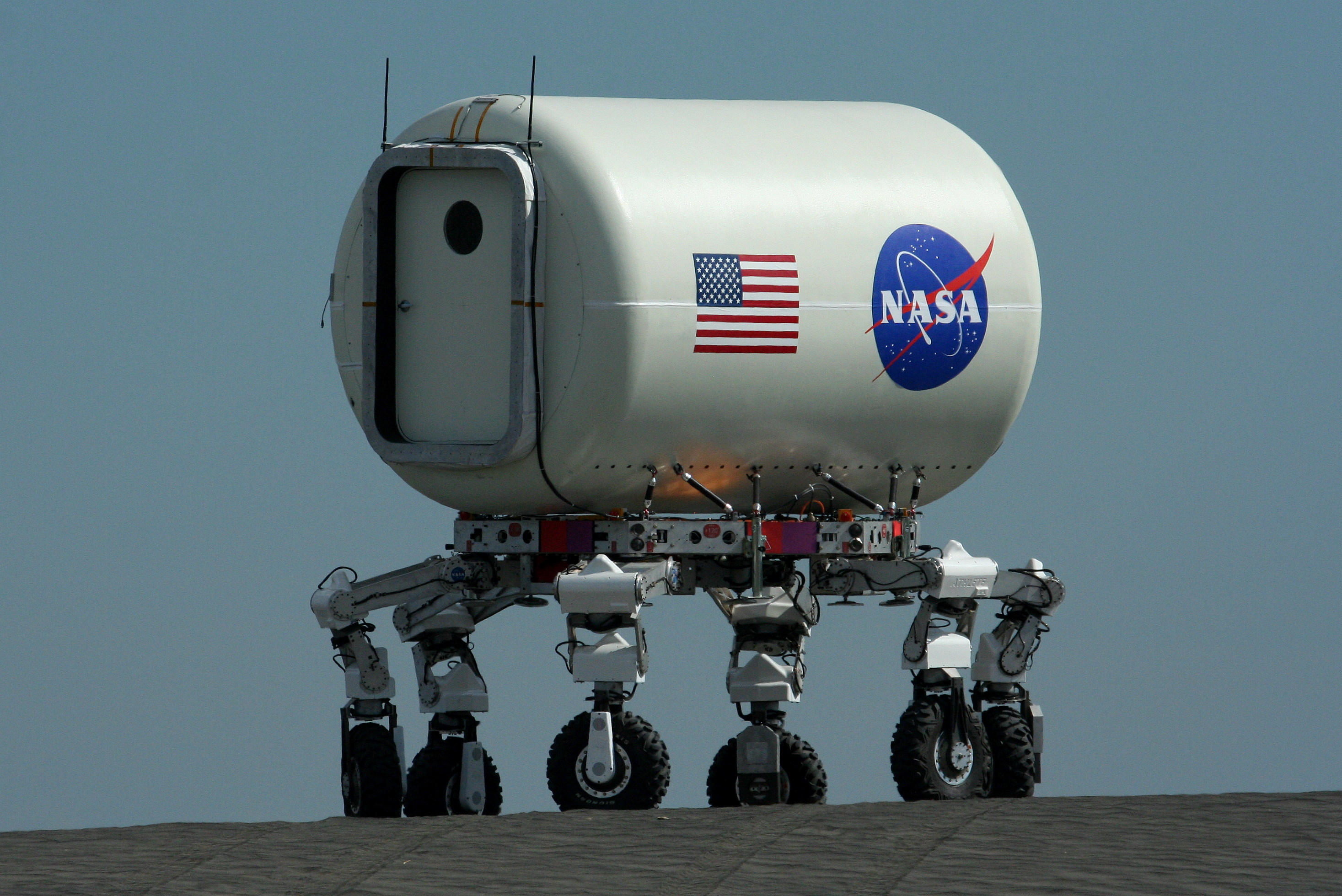
Rover with crew habitat

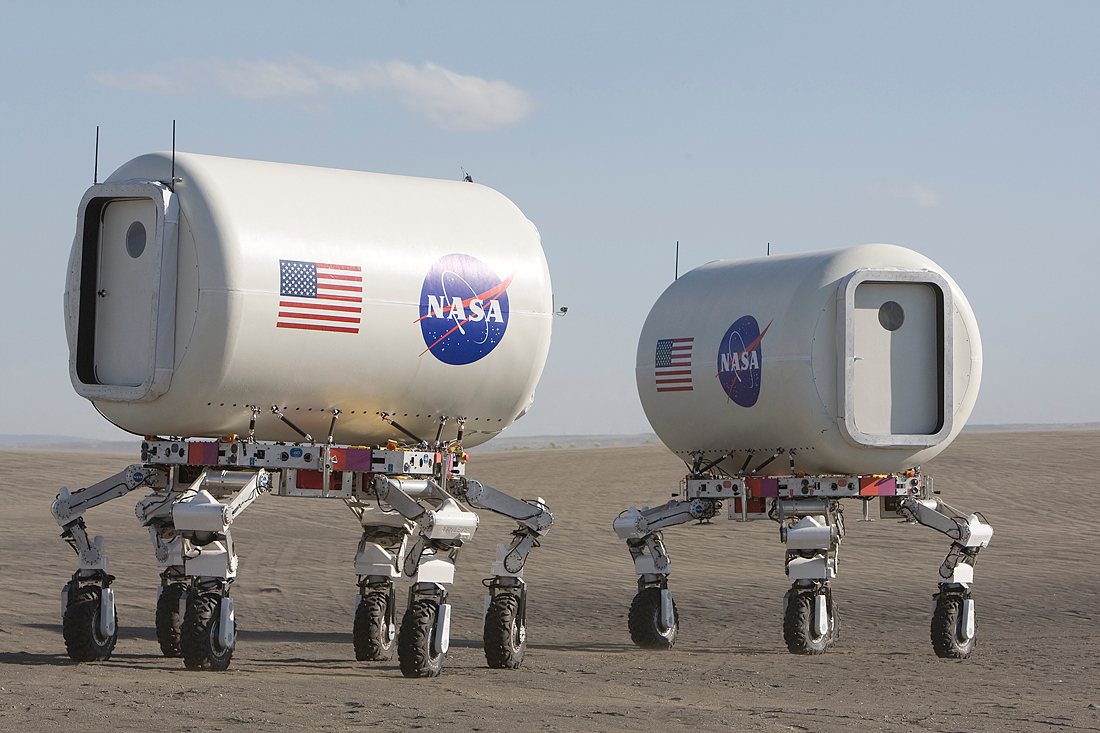
Pair of rovers with habitats

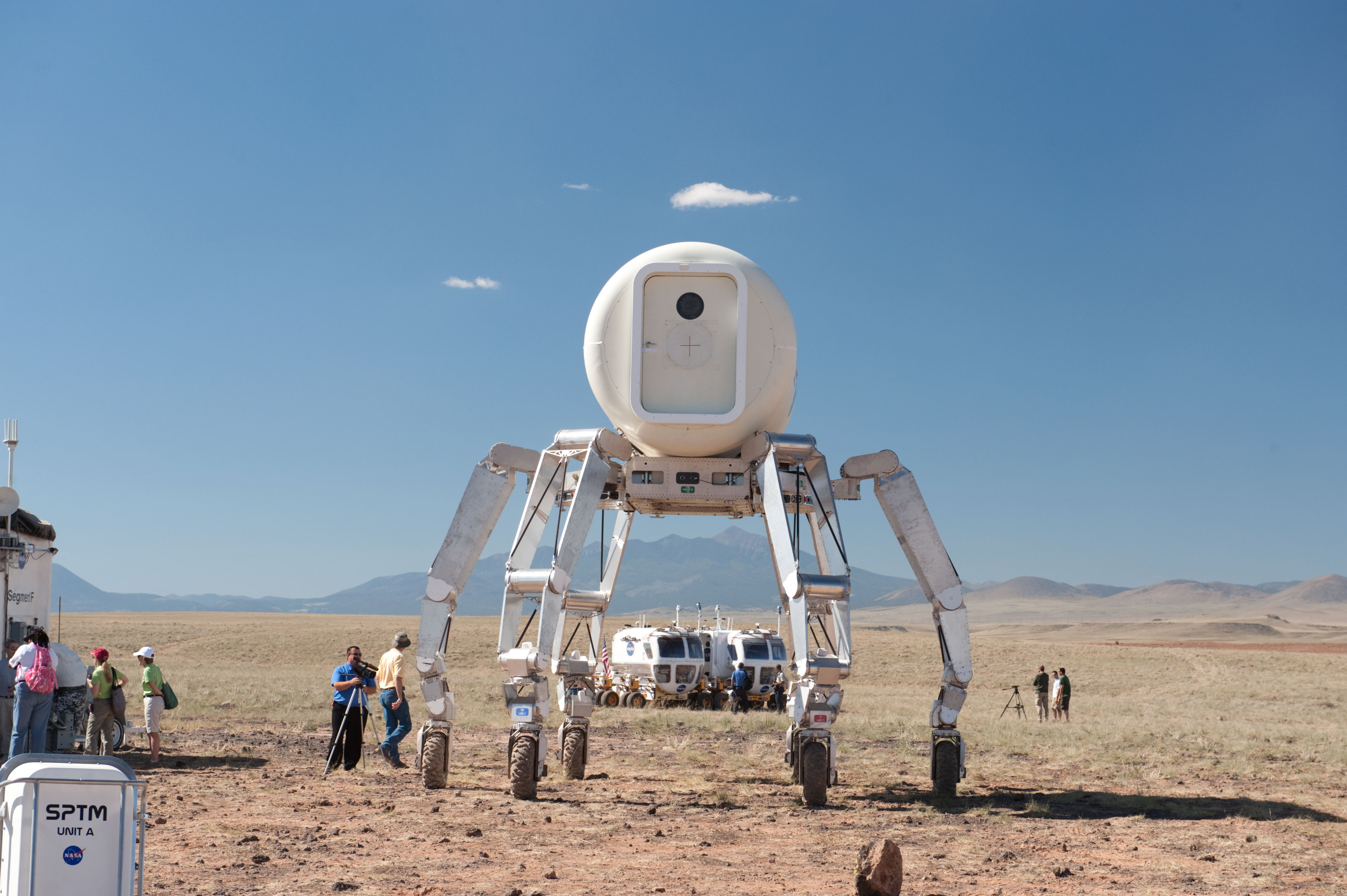
Front view of rover with habitat

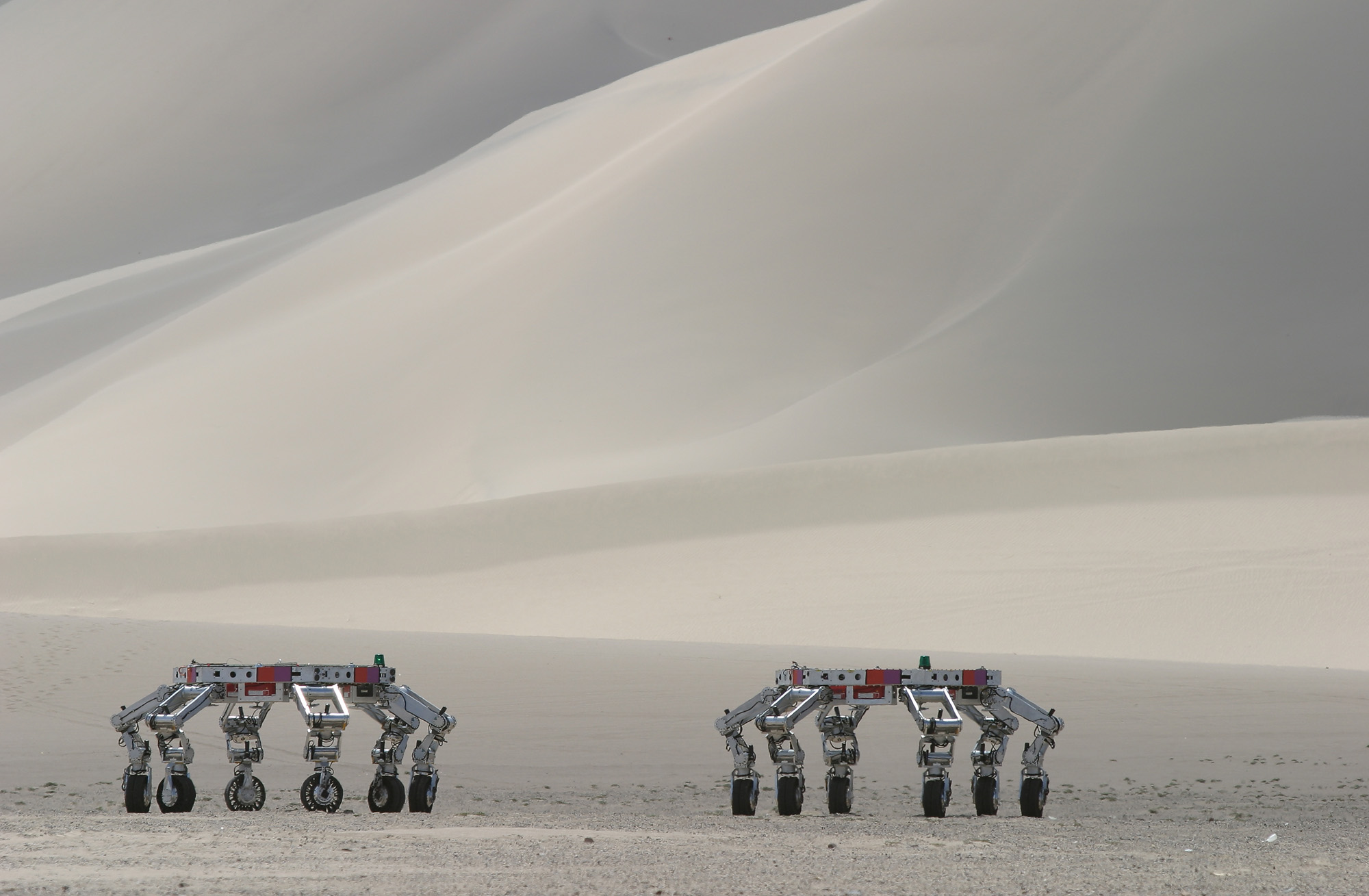
ATHLETE rovers traverse the desert terrain adjacent to Dumont Dunes, California
