= ILC Dover =

American special engineering development and manufacturing company

ILC Dover, LP
- Founded: 1947; 79 years ago
- Founder: International Latex Corporation
- Headquarters: Frederica, Delaware
- Owner: Ingersoll Rand; (2024–present)
- Website: www.ilcdover.com

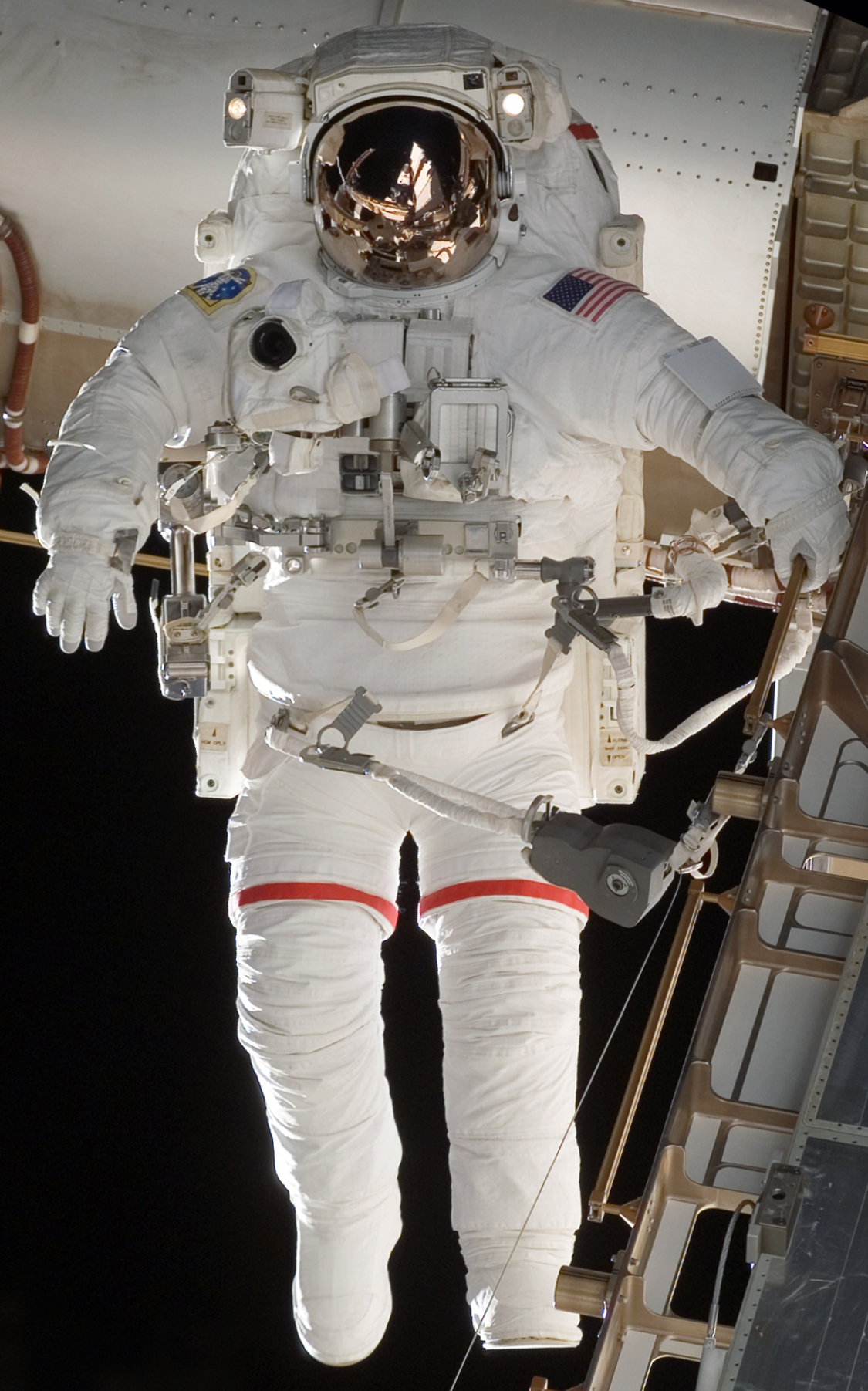
EMU suit worn during EVA on the International Space Station

ILC Dover is an American special engineering development and manufacturing company, globally headquartered in Frederica, Delaware. It specializes in the use of high-performance flexible materials, serving the aerospace, personal protection, and pharmaceutical industries.

On June 3, 2024, Ingersoll Rand announced the acquisition of ILC.

== Overview ==
Best known for making space suits for NASA, ILC outfitted every United States astronaut in the Apollo program, including the twelve that walked on the Moon. It also designed and manufactured the Space Suit Assembly portion of the Extravehicular Mobility Unit (EMU) developed by Collins Aerospace, worn by astronauts during performance of extra-vehicular activity (EVA) on Space Shuttle missions and on the International Space Station.

Other ILC Dover products include the airbag landing devices for Mars Pathfinder and Mars Exploration Rover (MER) missions; lighter-than-air vehicles, including airships, aerostats, and zeppelins; chemical, biological, radiological, and nuclear (CBRN) masks and hood systems; and flexible powder-containment solutions for the pharmaceutical industry.

== History ==
ILC Dover initially formed as a branch of the International Latex Corporation, the company founded in 1932 by Abram Spanel and later known as Playtex best known for manufacture of women's undergarments. The International Latex Corporation supported American efforts in World War II with latex products such as attack boats, life rafts, and canteens. In 1947, the International Latex Corporation split into four divisions, one of which, the Metals Division, eventually became ILC Dover.

Located at that time in Dover, Delaware, ILC's earliest work was on high-altitude pressure helmets and high-altitude pressure suits for the U.S Navy and Air Force. In 1965, ILC (then known as the Government and Industrial Division of the International Latex Corporation) was awarded the prime contract for the Apollo Lunar Space Suit, based on its unique approach to designing flexible joints in air filled suits. ILC designed and manufactured the suit worn by astronauts in the Apollo program, including Neil Armstrong during the first moonwalk. By 1969, ILC's workforce expanded to 900 employees as it supported the space program through production of Apollo space suits and a sun shield to protect Skylab, the first U.S. space station.

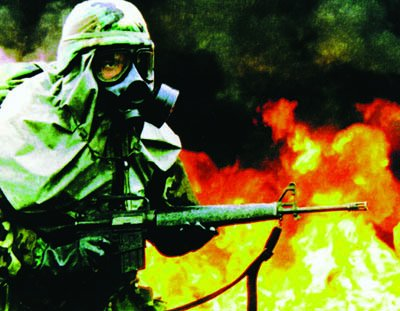
M40 Gas Mask

In 1974, the Skylab program ended, and ILC faced an immediate need to diversify their product offerings. That same year, ILC delivered its first aerostat to the U.S. Air Force for use at Cudjoe Key Air Force Station. Subsequently, they entered the field of personal protective equipment, paving the way for the development of industrial protection suits, such as the Chemturion suit line. In later years, their development of protective equipment expanded into type classified military chemical, biological, radiological, and nuclear (CBRN) masks and hood systems (for example, the M43, M40, MBU-19/P). The M40/M42 masks became the standard field mask of the U.S. Army, and, as of 2010, over two million had been produced and sold. Hamilton Standard, of Windsor Locks, Connecticut, was contracted to oversee ILC's suit manufacture due to ILC's inexperience with federal government contracts.

In 1977, ILC Dover, in conjunction with Hamilton Standard, began development and manufacture of the Extravehicular Mobility Unit (EMU), the suit worn by astronauts during Space Shuttle and Space Station extra-vehicular activity (EVA). ILC continued its support of the space program, while expanding its personal protection and lighter-than-air (LTA) vehicle lines.

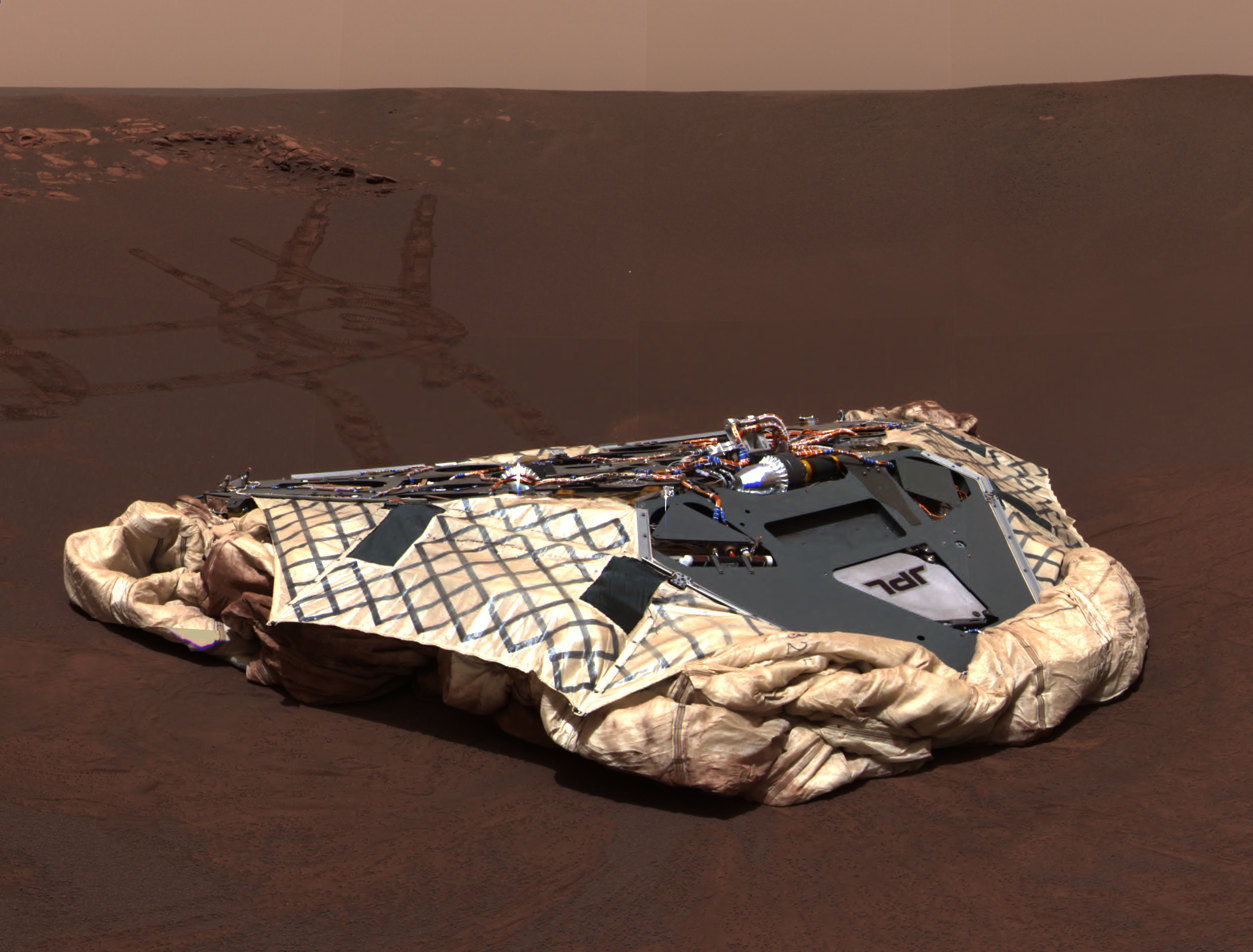
Mars Exploration Rover Opportunity airbag on the surface of Mars

In 1994 and 1995, ILC was awarded contracts with the German company Zeppelin Luftschifftechnik GmbH and the American Blimp Corporation for production of envelopes for each company. Over the following decade, ILC's production of LTA vehicles continued, and in 2001, ILC, in collaboration with TCOM and Uretek, developed and manufactured the world's largest pressurized LTA vehicle for CargoLifter in Brand, Germany.

In 1994, NASA's Jet Propulsion Laboratory contracted ILC to develop and manufacture the airbag landing system for the Mars Pathfinder mission, which cushioned Pathfinder's landing on July 4, 1997. In 2003, ILC's airbag system enabled the safe landing of the twin rovers, Spirit and Opportunity, during the Mars Exploration Rover (MER) missions.

In the 1990s ILC entered the pharmaceutical industry with the design and production of flexible containment systems, used to improve operator safety and ensure product purity during the manufacturing processing of potent pharmaceutical agents.

== Space suits ==
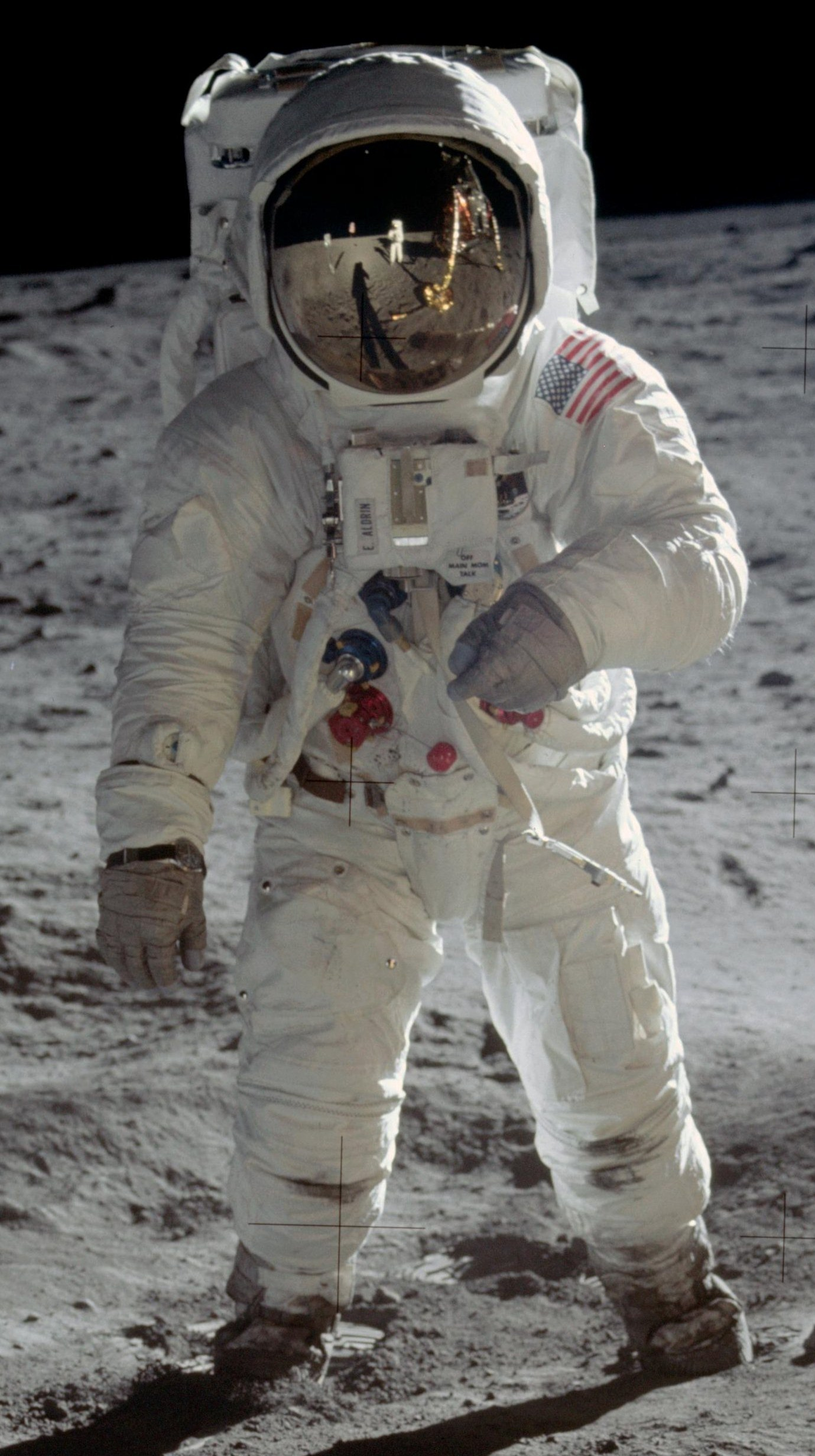
Apollo Spacesuit worn by Buzz Aldrin

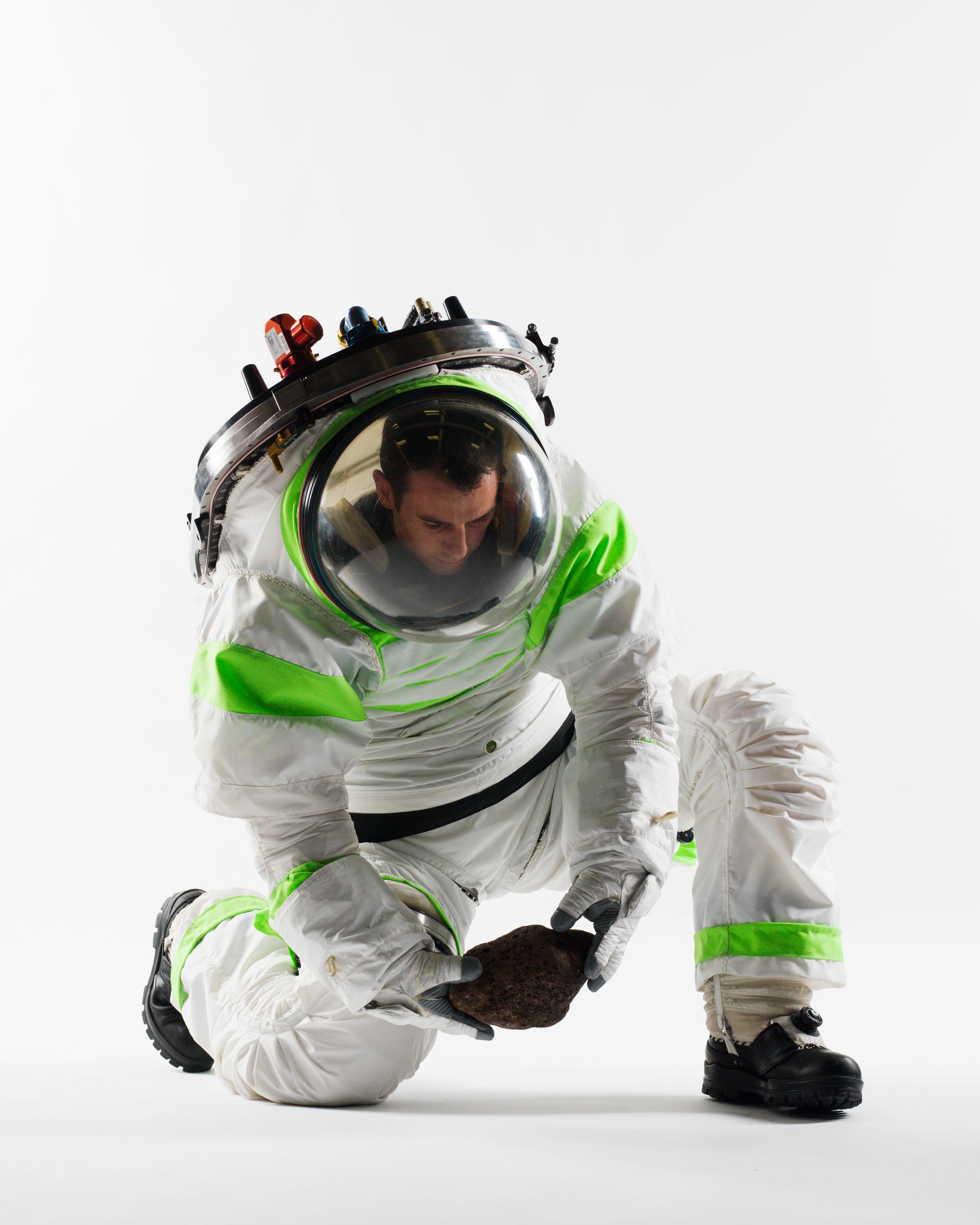
Z-1 Spacesuit Prototype - kneeling Nov 2012

Since the beginning of the Apollo Program, ILC has been the designer and producer of the space suit pressure garment for NASA. Throughout Apollo, Skylab, Space Shuttle, and Space Station missions, the space suit has been used to protect astronauts from hazards faced in Earth's orbit and on the surface of the Moon. These hazards include the vacuum environment of space, temperature extremes ranging from -250 degrees Fahrenheit to 250 degrees Fahrenheit, the impact of micrometeoroids and orbital debris, and lunar dust. Above 63,000-foot, spacesuits are needed to supply oxygen and to provide a pressurized environment around the body to keep body fluids in a liquid state.

=== Apollo and Skylab ===
ILC began delivering spacesuits for the Apollo program in 1966. Initial deliveries of suits did not perform well in tests and NASA initially cancelled its contract with ILC and Hamilton Standard. NASA relaunched the program to develop a spacesuit for the Apollo program, experimenting at first with hard suits. ILC and Hamilton Standard submitted competing designs this time; ILC won the sole contract based on its flexible, close-fitting design with a water-cooled undergarment, a blue inner pressurized layer, and an outer white nylon layer to protect the suits from rocks. Hamilton received a separate contract for the life-support backpack unit. ILC was told after the Apollo 1 fire to remove all flammable material from space suits. After a nationwide search, ILC settled on beta cloth, a fireproof silica fiber cloth. Apollo spacesuits were custom-made for each of the astronauts in the program, and for each of the 12 crewed flights carried out, ILC produced 15 suits. Three suits were made for each of the three astronauts comprising the crew (one suit for flight, one for training, one for back-up) and two suits were made for each of the three back-up crew members (one suit for flight and one for training). Twenty extra-vehicular activities (EVAs) were performed during the Apollo program, and ten were performed during Skylab. The Apollo suits were used for a total of 160 hours on the lunar surface.

=== Space Shuttle ===
The space suit used for EVA during Space Shuttle missions is the Extravehicular Mobility Unit (EMU), which has two parts: the space suit assembly (SSA), manufactured by ILC, and the life support system (LSS), manufactured by Hamilton Sundstrand (previously Hamilton Standard). The SSA is made of individual components which are assembled to fit each astronaut. Since the first shuttle EVA in 1983, 216 U.S. astronauts have performed a total of 74 shuttle EVAs, combining for greater than 470 hours in space.

=== International Space Station ===
The shuttle EMU was improved for use on the International Space Station (ISS). The suits for the ISS were modified to provide greater mobility, to afford better tactile capabilities of the glove, and to provide an increased operational life. As of February 2011, a total of 104 EVAs on the ISS had occurred, for greater than 650 total hours in space.

=== Mark III ===
The Mark III (MKIII) is an experimental suit that was designed by ILC for use on the space station. The suit is a combination of hard and soft elements, designed for pressurization to 8.3 psi (57 kPa). Shuttle suits are pressurized to 4.3 psi (30 kPa), and astronauts are required to breathe pure oxygen for several hours before EVA to remove all dissolved nitrogen from body fluids (to prevent "the bends" upon de-pressurization). Pressurization to 8.3 psi (57 kPa) would eliminate the need for a lengthy pre-breathing time. The Mk III has since been used in test programs that study space suit operations in the lunar and Mars surface environments.

=== Lunar and Mars suit prototype (I Suit) ===
The I-Suit is a lightweight experimental suit designed and manufactured by ILC to be used for high-mobility surface operations in gravity, such as on the lunar surface or on the surface of Mars. The I-suit is also being studied for use with next-generation NASA launch vehicles and commercial space vehicles.

=== Z-1 Prototype Suit ===
ILC continues in their space suit innovation with the development of the Z-1 Suit for NASA Designed and manufactured at ILC Dover's Houston facility. The Z-1 is the first suit to be integrated into a suit-port dock mechanism, eliminating the need for an air lock; and reducing the consumable demands on long-term missions.

=== Launch, Entry and Abort Suits (LEA) ===
ILC provided the intravehicular pressure suit for the Boeing Starliner. They also produce a LEA suit for the commercial space market known as SOL. This suit is the foundation for which they produced the Starliner units.

== Lighter than air structures ==
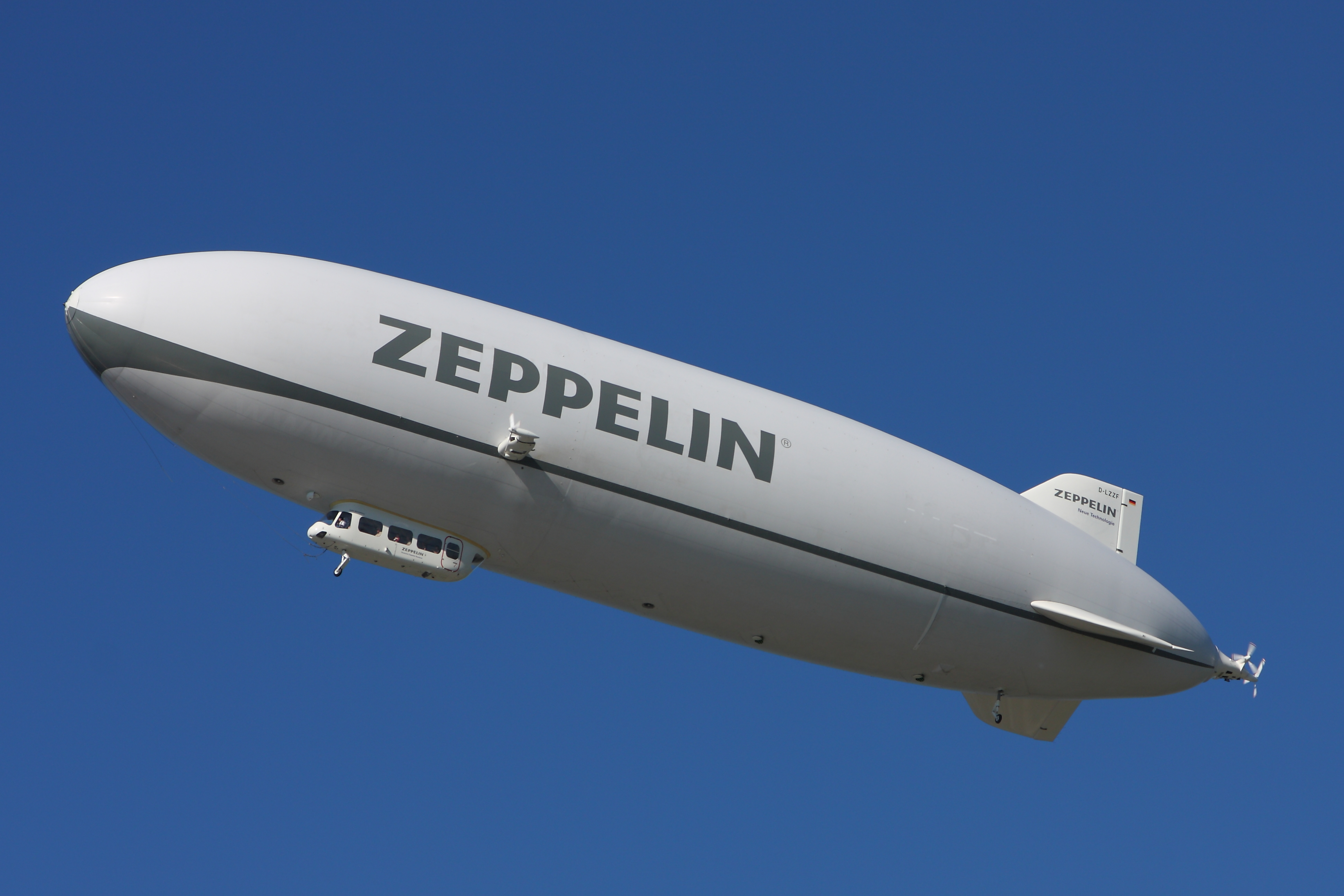
Lighter-Than-Air

Since the early 1970s, ILC has been designing and manufacturing softgoods structures for aerostats, airships, blimps, and other lighter-than-air (LTA) structures. ILC is the world's largest producer of modern aerostat and airship envelopes.

=== Airships and blimps ===
Airships and blimps are used for a variety of applications including transport and tourism; advertising; and surveillance. ILC's airship products are used by the U.S. military, the American Blimp Corporation, and Zeppelin Luftschifftechnik GmbH (Germany).

=== High altitude airships ===
Since the early 1980s, ILC has been involved in the design and development of high-altitude airships. The advent and growth of the cellular phone market renewed interest in the use of high-altitude airships as an economical alternative to satellites. In the past decade, ILC has worked with Lockheed Martin to support several US government-funded high-altitude airship (HAA) programs to define the system for a mobile platform capable of carrying various payloads, including communications and Intelligence, Surveillance, and Reconnaissance (ISR) sensors.

Tethered Aerostat

=== Tethered aerostats ===
Aerostats are typically used to carry surveillance radars to altitudes up to 15,000 feet (4,600 m) while tethered to the ground by a single tether. ILC has manufactured aerostats with volumes ranging from 56,000 to 595,000 cubic feet (1,600 to 16,800 m^{3}). The length of these aerostats ranges from 109 to 240 feet (33 to 73 m).

=== Heavy-lift airships and balloons ===
The lift generated by a helium-filled LTA vehicle can allow heavy loads to be transported in an economical manner. In the early 1990s, ILC helped design and manufacture logging balloons, devices used in the northwestern U.S. and western Canada for the purpose of retrieving logs from mountainous areas inaccessible by road.

== Personal protective equipment ==
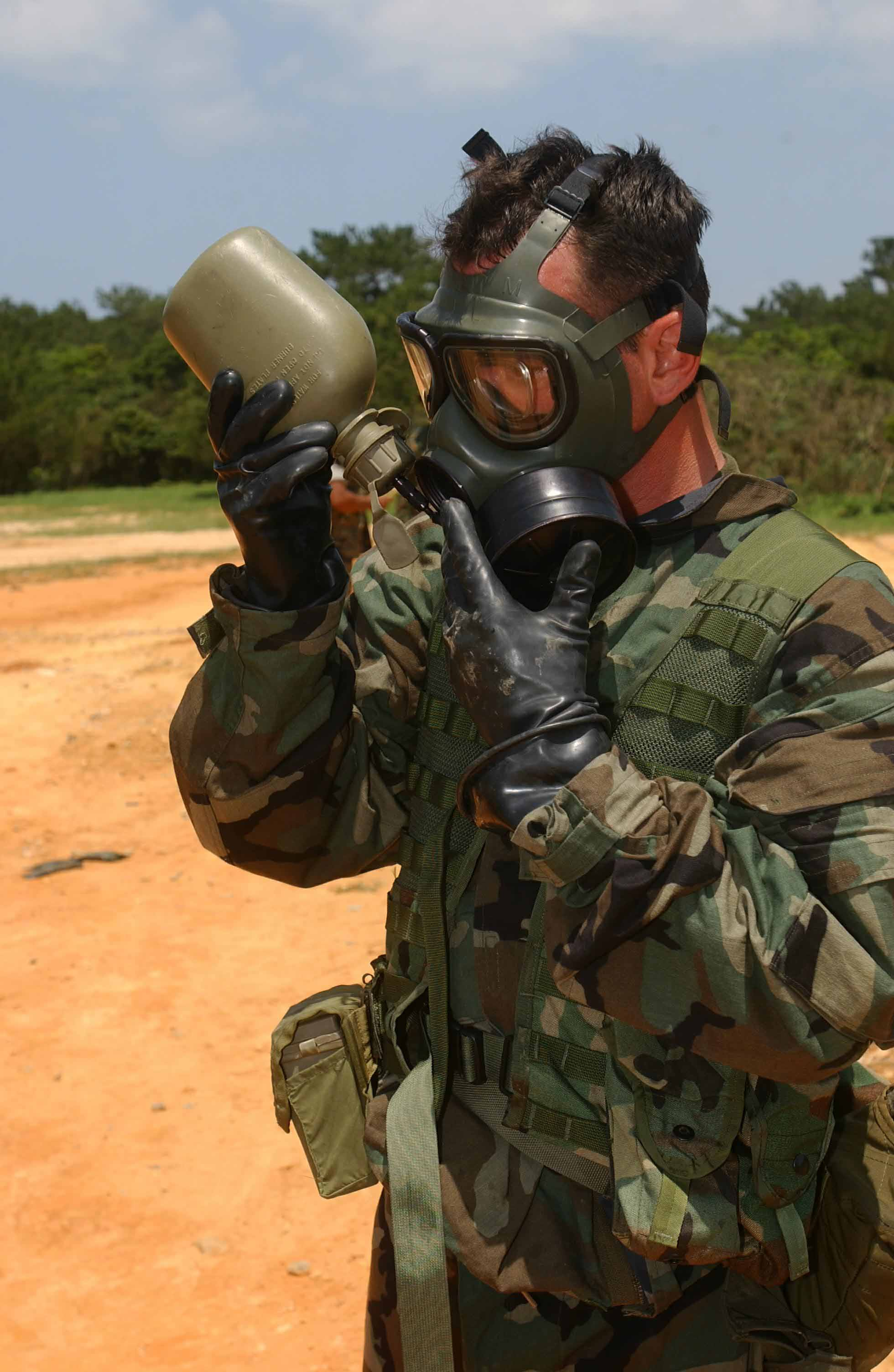
M40 gas mask

Since the mid-1970s, ILC has designed and produced products for chemical and biological protection. Currently, ILC designs and produces respirators, masks, and suits used to protect against chemical, biological, radiological and nuclear (CBRN) threats. The products are used by U.S. military troops, federal employees, scientists and health care workers.

=== Masks and respirators ===
ILC produces powered air-purifying respirators (PAPRs). These include the Sentinel XL CBRN PAPR, used to protect against CBRN threats; the Sentinel HP PAPR, used to protect against infectious disease; and the Sentinel XT PAPR, used to protect pharmaceutical workers from airborne active pharmaceutical ingredients (APIs). They also produce an air-purifying escape respirator (APER), the SCape CBRN, and the M40/42 gas mask used by the U.S. military.

=== Protective suits ===
In the late 1970s, ILC developed a special garment, the Demilitarization Protective Ensemble (DPE), to fulfill the U.S. Army's need for an off-the-shelf, positive pressure, totally encapsulating suit for use by maintenance personnel at a chemical weapons site. The DPE was delivered to the Army in 1979 and is still in daily use, with over 700 recorded entries into a "hot" environment and a perfect safety record.

From the technology used in production of the DPE, ILC developed a protective suit to be used for commercial applications. The Chemturion is a multi-use, totally encapsulating protective suit, currently used by Public Health Canada, Boston University, USAMRIID and AI Signal Research, the Center for Disease Control in Atlanta, and many industrial companies such as DuPont, Dow, and Georgia Pacific.

== Flexible pharmaceutical containment systems ==
ILC designs and manufactures products that allow for flexible containment of potent pharmaceutical agents during the pharmaceutical drug manufacturing process. Such containment systems enable the safe and effective processing of active pharmaceutical ingredients. Flexible enclosure systems or specific products, such as the DoverPac, G2Pac and Continuous Liner, can be incorporated into various procedures in the manufacturing process to provide containment of potent pharmaceutical agents, protecting workers from harmful exposure and ensuring purity of the pharmaceutical agents by preventing contamination.

== Space inflatables ==
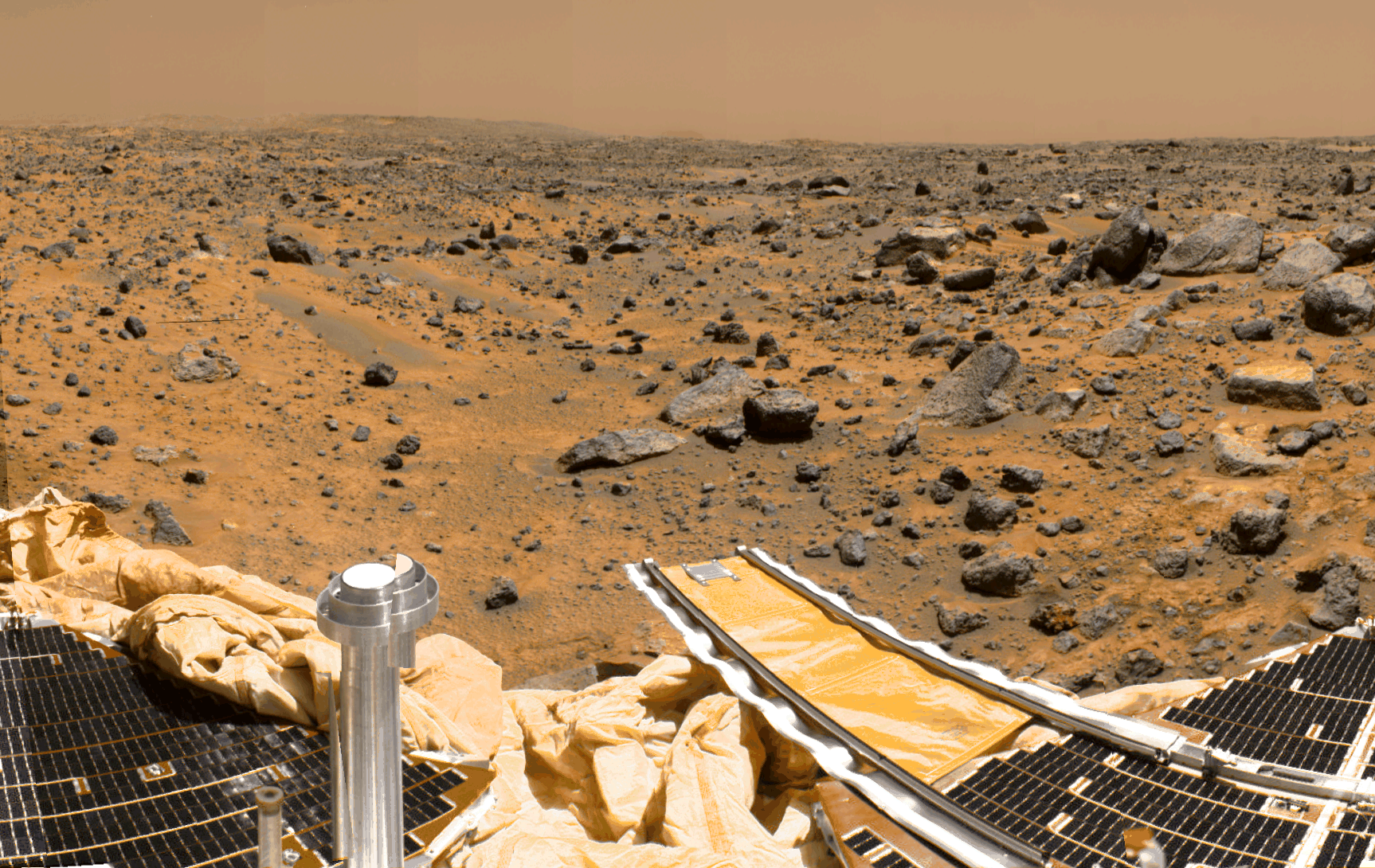
Pathfinder airbag on Mars

ILC designs and manufactures inflatable structures for use in earth orbit, lunar, and planetary exploration. Inflatable structures have been used on a number of space missions for a variety of applications including specialized flexible containment covers (Hubble Space Telescope), impact attenuation airbag systems, and inflatable aerodynamic decelerators.

=== Habitats and shelters ===
ILC has developed and manufactured a variety of inflatable habitats, airlocks, and shelters for use in Earth orbit and lunar / planetary exploration. Lunar habitat projects include the X-Hab Lunar Habitat, the InFlex Lunar Habitat, the Toroidal Lunar Habitat, and the Expandable Lunar Habitat. ILC has also worked on the Antarctic Habitat Planetary Analog Study, the Lawrence Livermore Inflatable Space Station, and the Minimum Function Habitat.

=== Impact bags ===
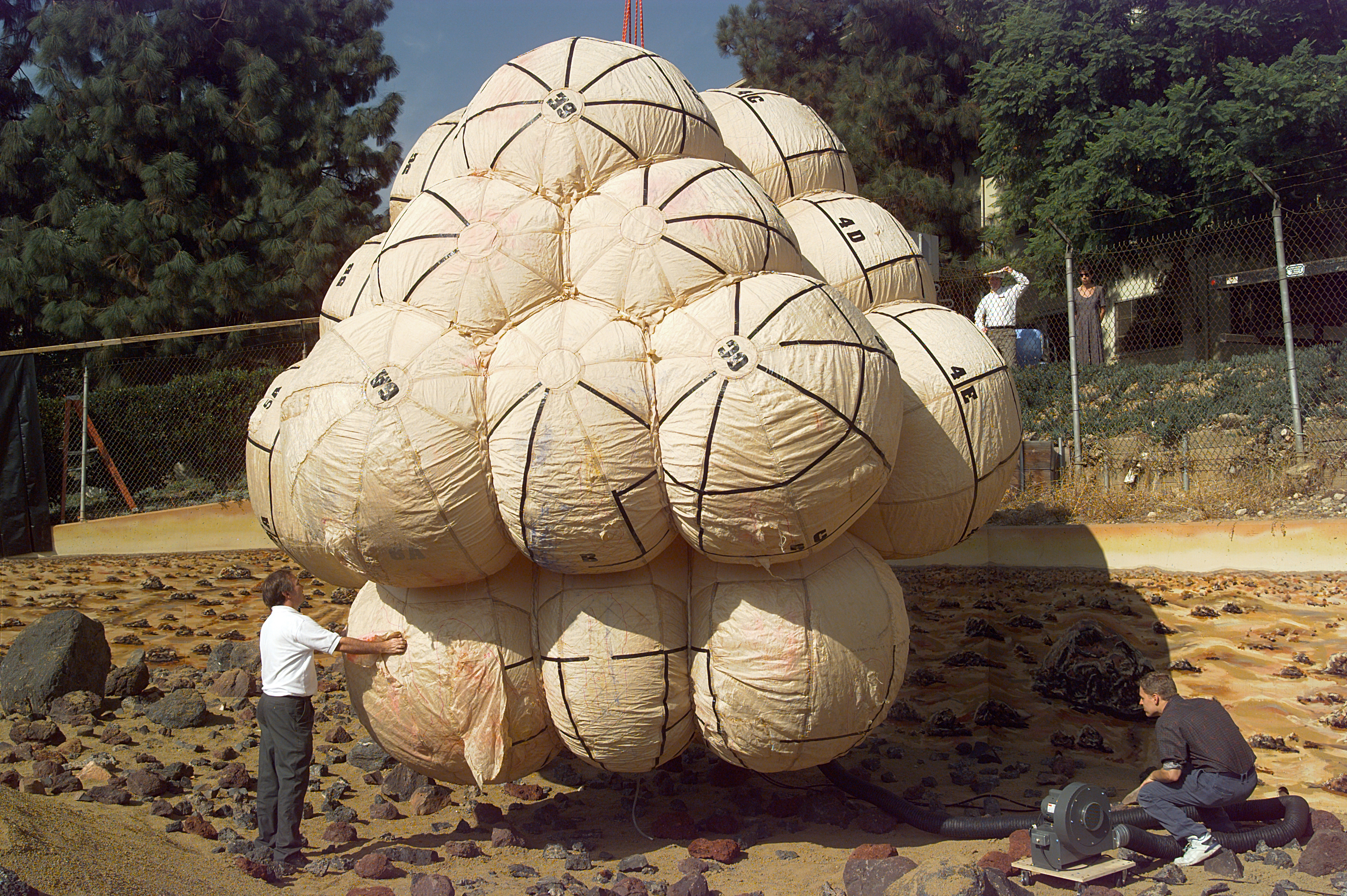
The Pathfinder air bags are tested in June 1995

For decades, ILC has worked on the design and manufacture of inflatable airbag systems. ILC's most notable accomplishments are the Mars Pathfinder and Mars Exploration Rover (MER) airbags which helped land the Sojourner, Spirit, and Opportunity rovers on the surface of Mars. In addition to planetary landing systems, ILC has designed and fabricated airbag landing systems to safely return crewed and uncrewed space systems to the surface of Earth. This includes airbags for the Orion spacecraft, and the Advanced Launch System.

=== Other ===
Other inflatable products with space applications include ballutes and decelerators; inflatable and deployable antennas; sunshields, solar sails and solar arrays; radiation shields; decoys; and planetary balloons.

== Engineered inflatables ==
ILC has produced numerous inflatable structures for military and aerospace applications. Inflatable structures are those made from high-performance flexible materials, often providing weight, size, and economic advantages over structures made from traditional metal or composite materials. Products include ballutes and decelerators; floats; munition dispensing systems; UAV wings; radomes; and shelters.
