= Demilitarization Protective Ensemble =

Disposable suit for chemical weapons disposal

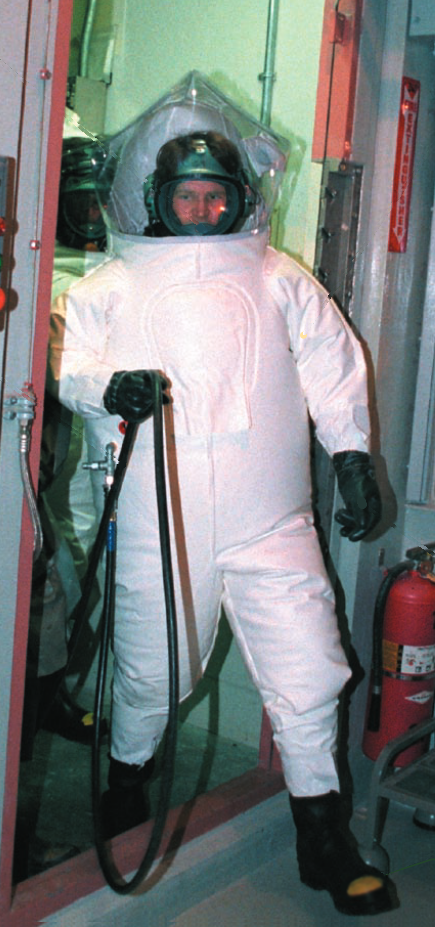
A worker wearing a DPE suit

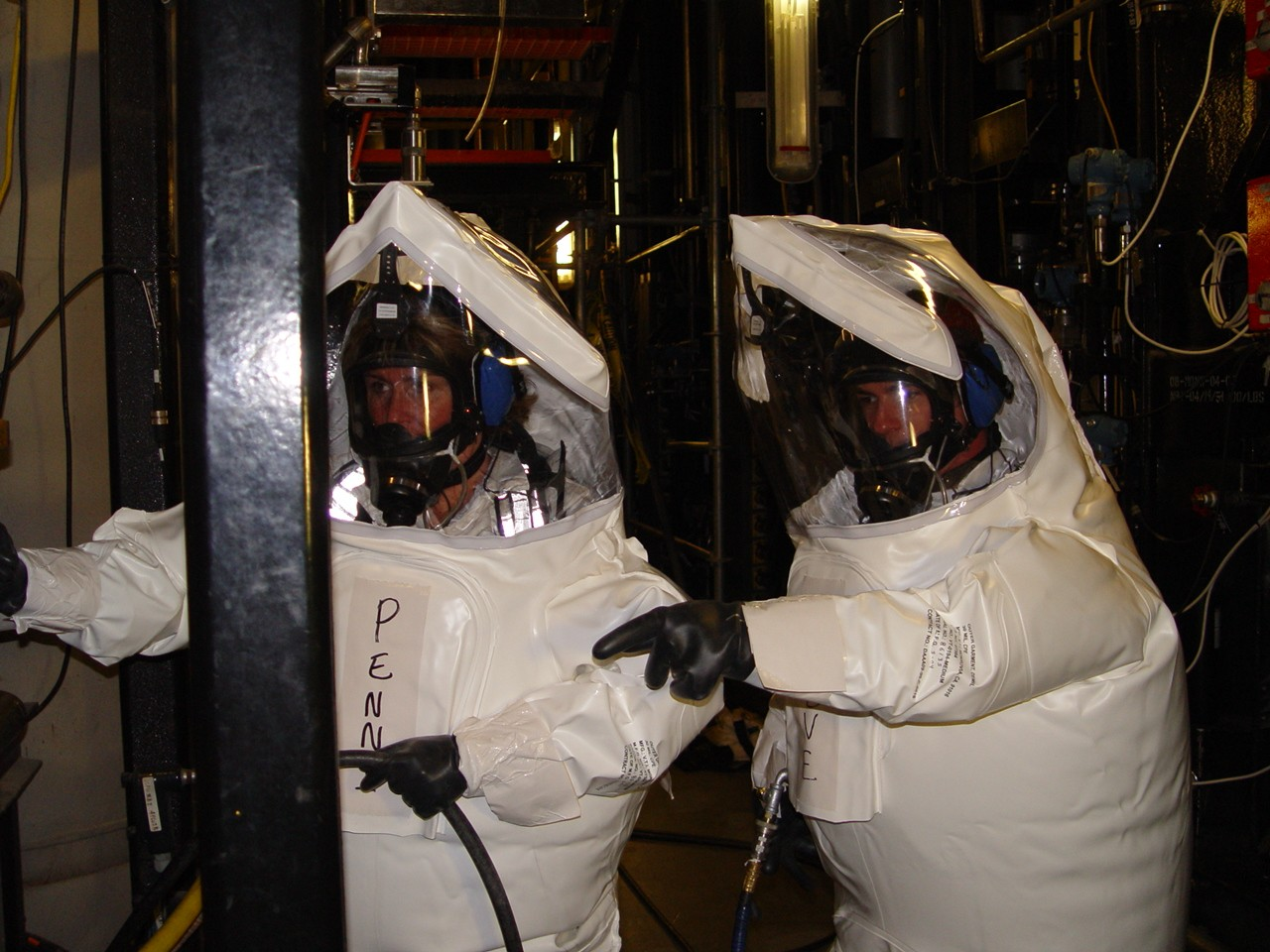
Two workers in DPE suits perform maintenance work at the Newport Chemical Agent Disposal Facility.

The Demilitarization Protective Ensemble (DPE) is a heat-sealed, one-time-use positive pressure personnel suit.

These airtight suits are used by the U.S. Army Chemical Materials Agency to provide the highest level of protection against chemical agent exposure for workers accessing areas of chemical weapon disposal plants where chemical weapons are disassembled and the agent destroyed. Workers at Pine Bluff Chemical Agent Disposal Facility and other disposal sites have successfully completed tens of thousands of entries into these areas wearing DPE suits.

With supporting equipment, the suit weighs about 50 pounds. Donning the suit takes between 30 and 45 minutes, with the assistance of a team of dressers.

The suit's primary air supply comes through a hose connection to purified air; a self-contained breathing apparatus provides 8 to 10 minutes of escape air in case the primary supply is disrupted. A heart monitor around the wearer's chest checks for signs of distress.

The suit's gloves have three layers, with thick butyl rubber gloves as the top layer, and the feet of the one-piece suit slip into butyl rubber boots that are then sealed to the suit.

A radio transmitter provides contact with emergency backup personnel, the control room and other support staff.
