= Apollo 9 =

Third crewed mission of the Apollo space program

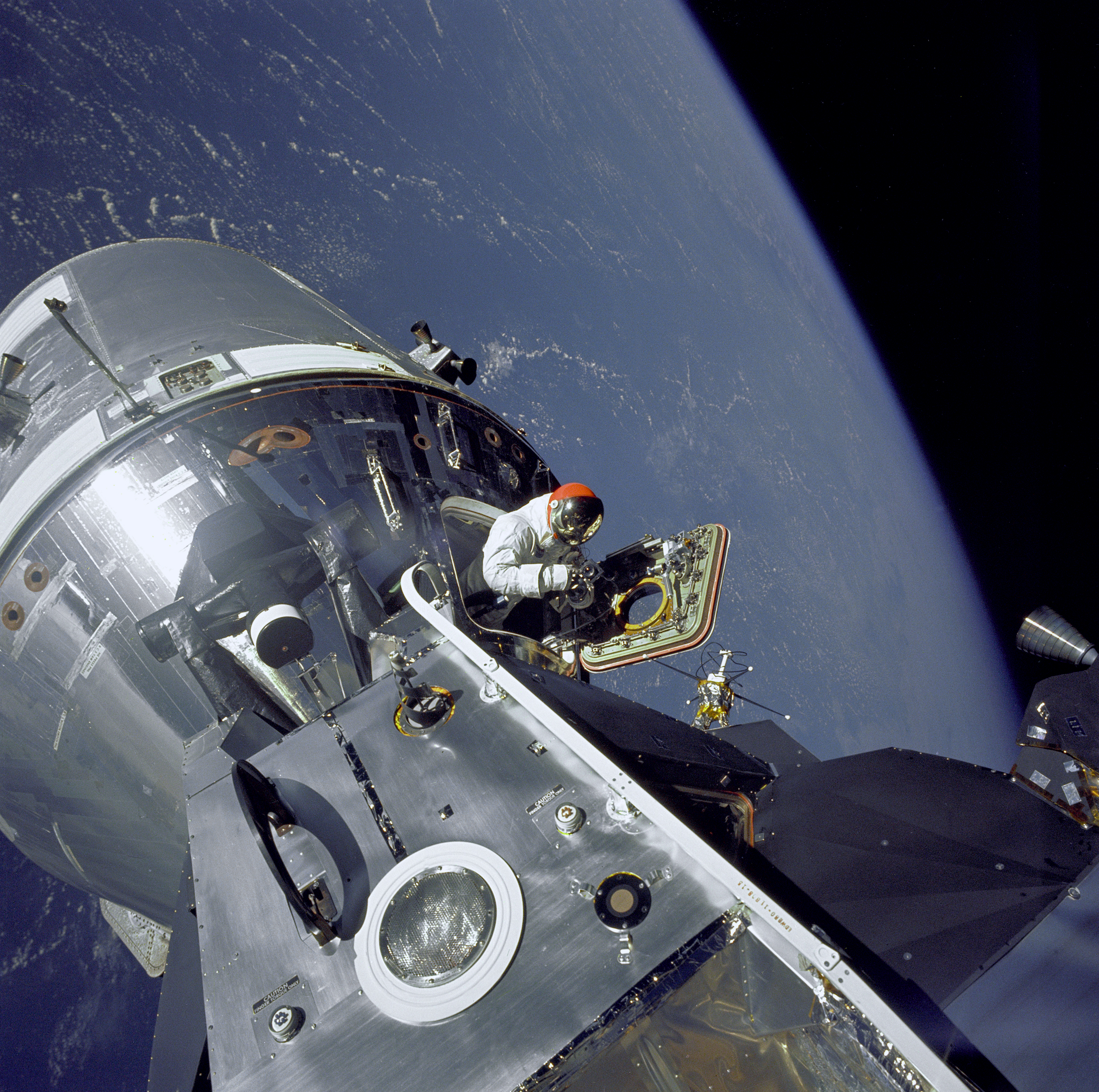
- CM pilot David Scott performs a stand-up EVA from CM Gumdrop, seen from docked LM Spider
- Mission type: Crewed Earth orbital CSM/LM flight (D)
- Operator: NASA
- COSPAR ID: CSM: 1969-018A; LM ascent stage: 1969-018C; LM descent stage: 1969-018D
- SATCAT no.: CSM: 3769; LM: 3771
- Mission duration: 10 days, 1 hour, 54 seconds
- Orbits completed: 151

Spacecraft properties
- Spacecraft: Apollo CSM-104; Apollo LM-3
- Manufacturer: CSM: North American Rockwell; LM: Grumman
- Launch mass: 95,231 lb (43,196 kg)
- Landing mass: 11,094 lb (5,032 kg)

Crew
- Crew size: 3
- Members: James A. McDivitt; David R. Scott; Russell L. Schweickart
- Callsign: CSM: Gumdrop; LM: Spider
- EVAs: 1
- EVA duration: 1 hour, 17 seconds

Start of mission
- Launch date: March 3, 1969, 16:00:00 UTC
- Rocket: Saturn V SA-504
- Launch site: Kennedy, LC-39A

End of mission
- Recovered by: USS Guadalcanal
- Decay date: October 23, 1981 (LM ascent stage)
- Landing date: March 13, 1969, 17:00:54 UTC
- Landing site: North Atlantic Ocean (23°15′N 67°56′W)

Orbital parameters
- Reference system: Geocentric
- Regime: Low Earth orbit
- Perigee altitude: 204 km (110 nmi; 127 mi)
- Apogee altitude: 497 km (268 nmi; 309 mi)
- Inclination: 33.8°
- Period: 91.55 minutes
- Epoch: March 5, 1969

Docking with Luner Module
- Docking date: March 3, 1969, 19:01:59 UTC
- Undocking date: March 7, 1969, 12:39:06 UTC

Docking with Lunar Module ascent stage
- Docking date: March 7, 1969, 19:02:26 UTC
- Undocking date: March 7, 1969, 21:22:45 UTC
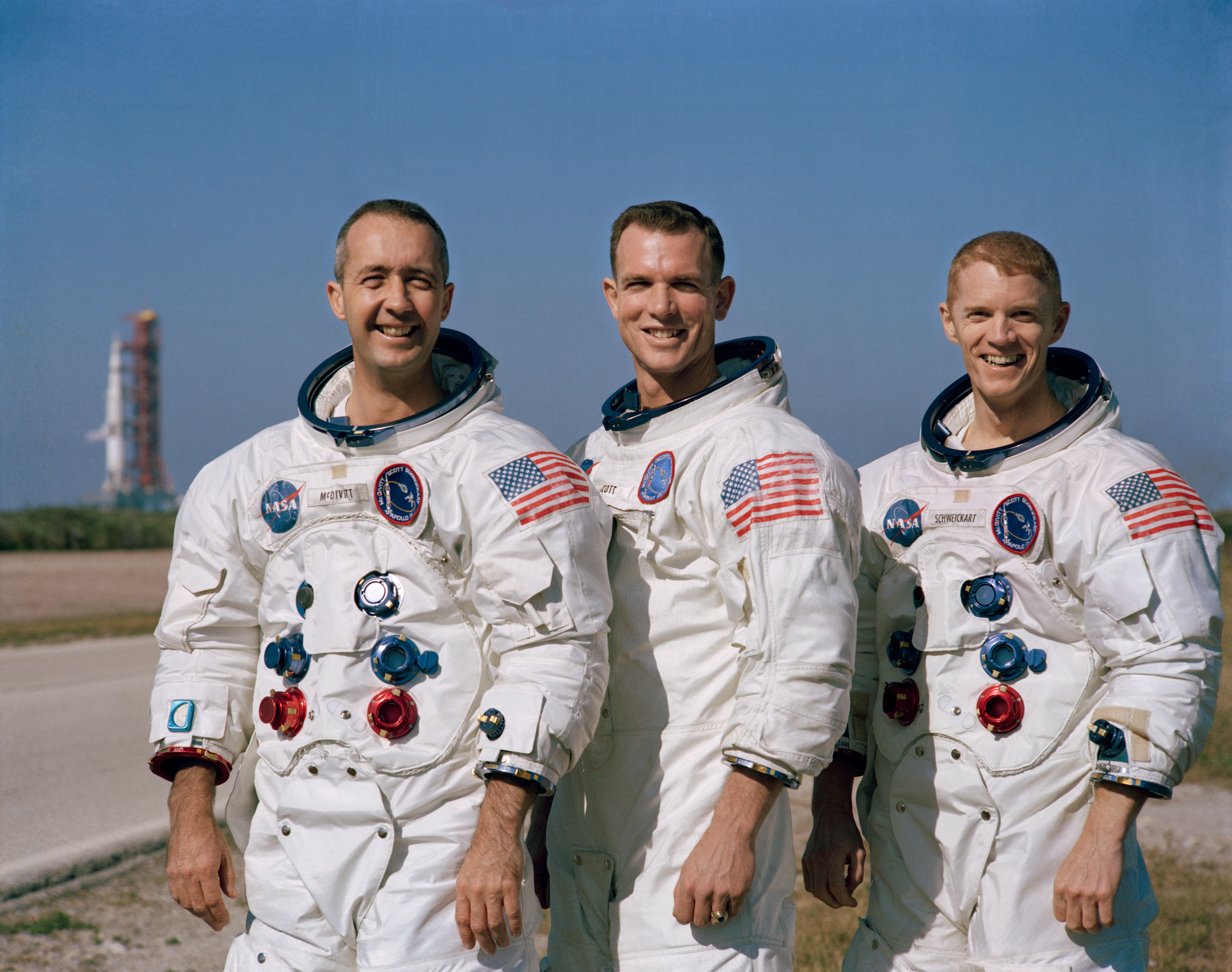
- Left to right: McDivitt, Scott, Schweickart Apollo program

Apollo 9 (March 3–13, 1969) was the third human spaceflight in NASA's Apollo program, which successfully tested systems and procedures critical to landing on the Moon. The three-man crew consisted of Commander James McDivitt, Command Module Pilot David Scott, and Lunar Module Pilot Rusty Schweickart. Flown in low Earth orbit, it was the second crewed Apollo mission that the United States launched via a Saturn V rocket, and was the first flight of the full Apollo spacecraft: the command and service module (CSM) with the Lunar Module (LM).

The mission was flown to qualify the LM for lunar orbit operations in preparation for the first Moon landing by demonstrating its descent and ascent propulsion systems, showing that its crew could fly it independently, then rendezvous and dock with the CSM again, as would be required for the first crewed lunar landing. Other objectives of the flight included firing the LM descent engine to propel the spacecraft stack as a backup mode (as was required on the Apollo 13 mission), and use of the portable life support system backpack outside the LM cabin.

After launching on March 3, 1969, the crew performed the first crewed flight of an Apollo Lunar Module, the first docking and extraction of the same, one two-person spacewalk (EVA), and the second docking of two crewed spacecraft—two months after the Soviets performed a spacewalk crew transfer between Soyuz 4 and Soyuz 5. The mission concluded on March 13 and was a complete success. It proved the LM worthy of crewed spaceflight, setting the stage for the dress rehearsal for the lunar landing, Apollo 10, before the ultimate goal, landing on the Moon.

== Mission background ==
In April 1966, McDivitt, Scott, and Schweickart were selected by Director of Flight Crew Operations Deke Slayton as the second Apollo crew. Their initial job was as backup to the first Apollo crew to be chosen, Gus Grissom, Ed White, and Roger Chaffee, for the first crewed Earth orbital test flight of the block I command and service module, designated AS-204. Delays in the block I CSM development pushed AS-204 into 1967. The revised plan had the McDivitt crew scheduled for the second crewed CSM, which was to rendezvous in Earth orbit with an uncrewed LM, launched separately. The third crewed mission, to be commanded by Frank Borman, was to be the first launch of a Saturn V with a crew.

On January 27, 1967, Grissom's crew was conducting a launch-pad test for their planned February 21 mission, which they named Apollo 1, when a fire broke out in the cabin, killing all three men. A complete safety review of the Apollo program followed. During this time Apollo 5 took place, an uncrewed launch to test the first lunar module (LM-1).

Under the new schedule, the first Apollo crewed mission to go into space would be Apollo 7, planned for October 1968. This mission, which was to test the block II command module, did not include a lunar module. In 1967, NASA had adopted a series of lettered missions leading up to the crewed lunar landing, the "G mission", completion of one being a prerequisite to the next. Apollo 7 would be the "C mission", but the "D mission" required testing of the crewed lunar module, which was running behind schedule and endangering John F. Kennedy's goal of Americans walking on the Moon and returning safely to Earth by the end of the 1960s. McDivitt's crew had been announced by NASA in November 1967 as prime crew for the D mission, lengthy testing of the command and lunar modules in Earth orbit.

Seeking to keep Kennedy's goal on schedule, in August 1968, Apollo Program Manager George M. Low proposed that if Apollo 7 in October went well, Apollo 8 would go to lunar orbit without a LM. (Note: The Lunar Module was originally named the Lunar Excursion Module, abbreviated and pronounced as "LEM". Once the name was shortened to LM, NASA personnel continued to pronounce LM as "lem".) Until then, Apollo 8 was the D mission with Apollo 9 the "E mission", testing in medium Earth orbit. After NASA approved sending Apollo 8 to the Moon, while making Apollo 9 the D mission, Slayton offered McDivitt the opportunity to stay with Apollo 8 and thus go to lunar orbit. McDivitt turned it down on behalf of his crew, preferring to stay with the D mission, now Apollo 9.

Apollo 7 went well, and the crews were switched. The crew swap also affected who would be the first astronauts to land on the Moon, for when the crews for Apollo 8 and 9 were swapped, so were the backup crews. Since the rule of thumb was for backup crews to fly as prime crew three missions later, this put Neil Armstrong's crew (Borman's backup) in position to make the first landing attempt on Apollo 11 instead of Pete Conrad's crew, who made the second landing on Apollo 12.

== Crew and key Mission Control personnel ==
=== Prime Crew ===
Position	Astronaut
Commander	James A. McDivitt; Second and last spaceflight
Command Module Pilot (CMP)	David R. Scott; Second spaceflight
Lunar Module Pilot (LMP)	Russell L. Schweickart; Only spaceflight

McDivitt was in the Air Force; selected as a member of the second group of astronauts in 1962, he was command pilot of Gemini 4 (1965). Scott, also Air Force, was selected in the third astronaut group in 1963 and flew alongside Neil Armstrong in Gemini 8, on which the first spacecraft docking was performed. Schweickart, a civilian who had served in the Air Force and Massachusetts Air National Guard, was selected as a Group 3 astronaut but was not assigned to a Gemini mission and had no spaceflight experience.

=== Backup Crew ===
Position	Astronaut
Commander	Pete Conrad
Command Module Pilot	Richard F. Gordon Jr.
Lunar Module Pilot	Alan L. Bean

The backup crew initially consisted of Pete Conrad as commander, Command Module Pilot Richard F. Gordon Jr., and Lunar Module Pilot Clifton C. Williams Jr.. After Williams died in a T-38 crash in October 1967, he was replaced by Alan L. Bean. This crew flew as prime on Apollo 12 in November 1969. The support crew for Apollo 9 consisted of Stuart A. Roosa, Jack R. Lousma, Edgar D. Mitchell and Alfred M. Worden. Lousma was not an original member of the Apollo 9 support crew, but was assigned after Fred W. Haise Jr. was moved to the position of backup lunar module pilot on Apollo 8—several astronauts were shifted in the wake of Michael Collins being removed from the Apollo 8 prime crew because of treatment for bone spurs.

The flight directors were Gene Kranz, first shift, Gerry Griffin, second shift, and Pete Frank, third shift. Capsule communicators were Conrad, Gordon, Bean, Worden, Roosa and Ronald Evans.

=== Mission insignia ===
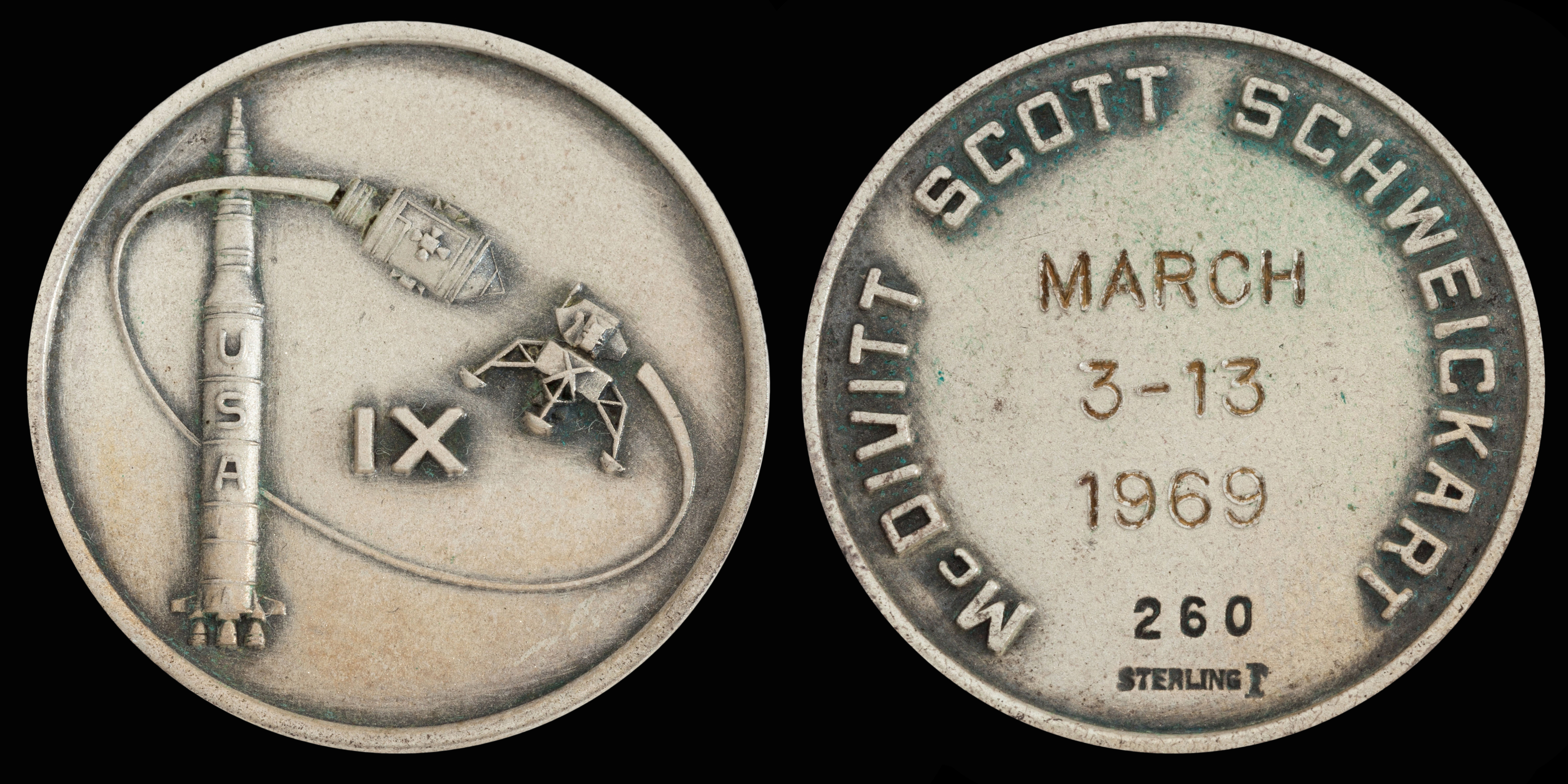
Apollo 9 space-flown silver Robbins medallion

The circular patch shows a drawing of a Saturn V rocket with the letters USA on it. To its right, an Apollo CSM is shown next to a LM, with the CSM's nose pointed at the "front door" of the LM rather than at its top docking port. The CSM is trailing rocket fire in a circle. The crew's names are along the top edge of the circle, with APOLLO IX at the bottom. The "D" in McDivitt's name is filled with red to mark that this was the "D mission" in the alphabetic sequence of Apollo missions. The patch was designed by Allen Stevens of Rockwell International.

== Planning and training ==
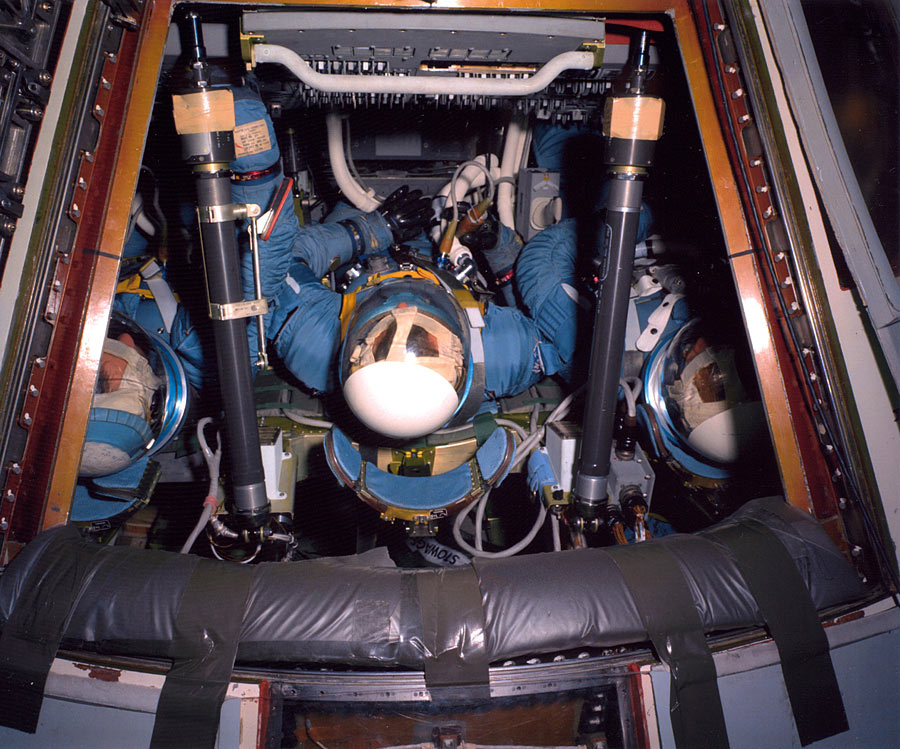
McDivitt, Scott, and Schweickart train for the AS-205/208 mission in the first Block II spacecraft and space suits, which still had most of the fire hazards the Apollo 1 spacecraft had.

Apollo 9's main purpose was to qualify the LM for crewed lunar flight, demonstrating that it could perform the maneuvers in space that would be needed for a lunar landing, including docking with the CSM. Colin Burgess and Francis French, in their book about the Apollo Program, deemed McDivitt's crew among the best trained ever—they had worked together since January 1966, at first as backups for Apollo 1, and they always had the assignment of being the first to fly the LM. Flight Director Gene Kranz deemed the Apollo 9 crew the best prepared for their mission, and felt Scott was an extremely knowledgeable CMP. Crew members underwent 1,800 hours of mission-specific training, about seven hours for every hour they would spend in flight. Their training started on the day before the Apollo 1 fire, in the very first Block II spacecraft in which they were originally intended to fly. They took part in the vehicle checkouts for the CSM at North American Rockwell's facility in Downey, California, and for the LM at Grumman's plant in Bethpage, New York. They also participated in testing of the modules at the launch site.

Among the types of the training which the crew underwent were simulations of zero-G, both underwater and in the Vomit Comet. During these exercises, they practiced for the planned extravehicular activities (EVAs). They traveled to Cambridge, Massachusetts, for training on the Apollo Guidance Computer (AGC) at MIT. The crew studied the sky at the Morehead Planetarium and at the Griffith Planetarium, especially focusing on the 37 stars used by the AGC. They each spent more than 300 hours in the CM and LM simulators at Kennedy Space Center (KSC) and at Houston, some involving live participation by Mission Control. Additional time was spent in simulators in other locations.

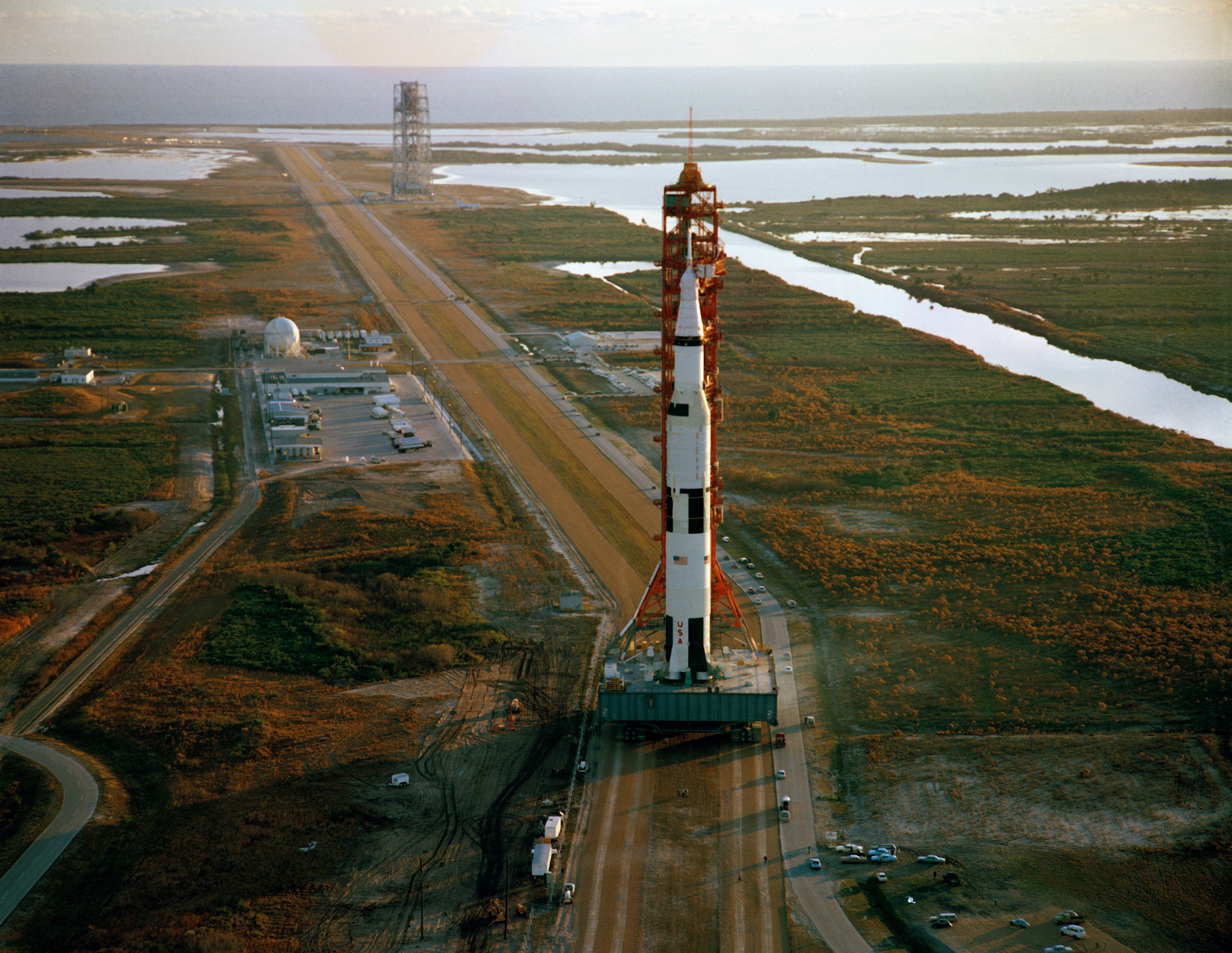
The launch vehicle for Apollo 9 being taken to Pad 39A

The first mission to use the CSM, the LM and a Saturn V, Apollo 9 allowed the launch preparations team at KSC its first opportunity to simulate the launch of a lunar landing mission. The LM arrived from Grumman in June 1968 and was subjected to extensive testing including in the altitude chamber, simulating space conditions. As this occurred, other technicians assembled the Saturn V inside the Vehicle Assembly Building (VAB). The CM and SM arrived in October, but even the experienced KSC team from North American had trouble joining them together. When the lander was done with the altitude chamber, the CSM took its place, letting the LM be available for installation of equipment such as rendezvous radar and antennas. There were no lengthy delays, and on January 3, 1969, the launch vehicle was taken out of the VAB and moved to Launch Complex 39A by crawler. Flight readiness reviews for the CM, the LM, and the Saturn V were held and passed in the following weeks.

== Hardware ==
=== Launch vehicle ===
The Saturn V (AS-504) used on Apollo 9 was the fourth to be flown, the second to carry astronauts to space, and the first to bear a lunar module. Although similar in configuration to the Saturn V used on Apollo 8, several changes were made. The inner core of the F-1 engine chamber in the first (S-IC) stage was removed, thus saving weight and allowing for a slight increase in specific impulse. Weight was also saved by replacing the skins of the liquid oxygen tanks with lighter ones, and by providing lighter versions of other components. Efficiency was increased in the S-II second stage with uprated J-2 engines, and through a closed-loop propellant utilization system rather than Apollo 8's open-loop system. Of the 3,250-pound (1,470 kg) weight reduction in the second stage, about half came from a 16 percent reduction in the thickness of the tank side walls.

=== Spacecraft, equipment and call signs ===
Apollo 9 used CSM-104, the third Block II CSM to be flown with astronauts aboard. Apollo 8, lacking a lunar module, did not have docking equipment; Apollo 9 flew the probe-and-drogue assembly used for docking along with other equipment added near the forward hatch of the CM; this allowed for rigid docking of the two craft, and for internal transfer between CM and LM. Had the switch in missions between Apollo 8 and 9 not occurred, the Earth-orbit mission would have flown CSM-103, which flew on Apollo 8.

The Earth-orbit mission was originally supposed to use LM-2 as its lunar module, but the crew found numerous flaws in it, many associated with it being the first flight-ready lunar module off Grumman's production line. The delay occasioned by the switch in missions allowed LM-3 to be available, a machine the crew found far superior. Neither LM-2 nor LM-3 could have been sent to the Moon as both were too heavy; Grumman's weight reduction program for the LMs only became fully effective with LM-5, designated for Apollo 11. Small cracks in LM-3's aluminum alloy structure due to stresses such as the insertion of a rivet proved an ongoing issue; Grumman's engineers continued working to fix them until the LM had to be mounted on the Saturn V in December 1968, where it was housed inside the Spacecraft-Lunar Module Adapter, numbered as SLA-11A. LM-2 never flew in space and is in the National Air and Space Museum.

The Apollo astronauts were provided with early versions of the Sony Walkman, portable cassette recorders intended to allow them to make observations during the mission. The Apollo 9 crew was the first to be allowed to bring music mixtapes, one each, that could be played in that device. McDivitt and Scott preferred easy listening and country music; Schweickart's cassette tape of classical music went missing until the ninth day of the ten-day mission, when it was presented to him by Scott.

After the Gemini 3 craft was dubbed Molly Brown by Grissom, NASA forbade naming spacecraft. The fact that during the Apollo 9 mission, the CSM and LM would separate and need different call signs caused the Apollo 9 astronauts to push for a change. In simulations, they began to refer to the CSM as "Gumdrop", a name inspired by the CM's appearance while in the blue protective wrapping in which it was transported from the manufacturer, and the LM as "Spider", inspired by the LM's appearance with landing legs deployed. Personnel in NASA public relations thought the names were too informal, but the call signs ultimately gained official sanction. NASA required more formal call signs for future missions, starting with Apollo 11.

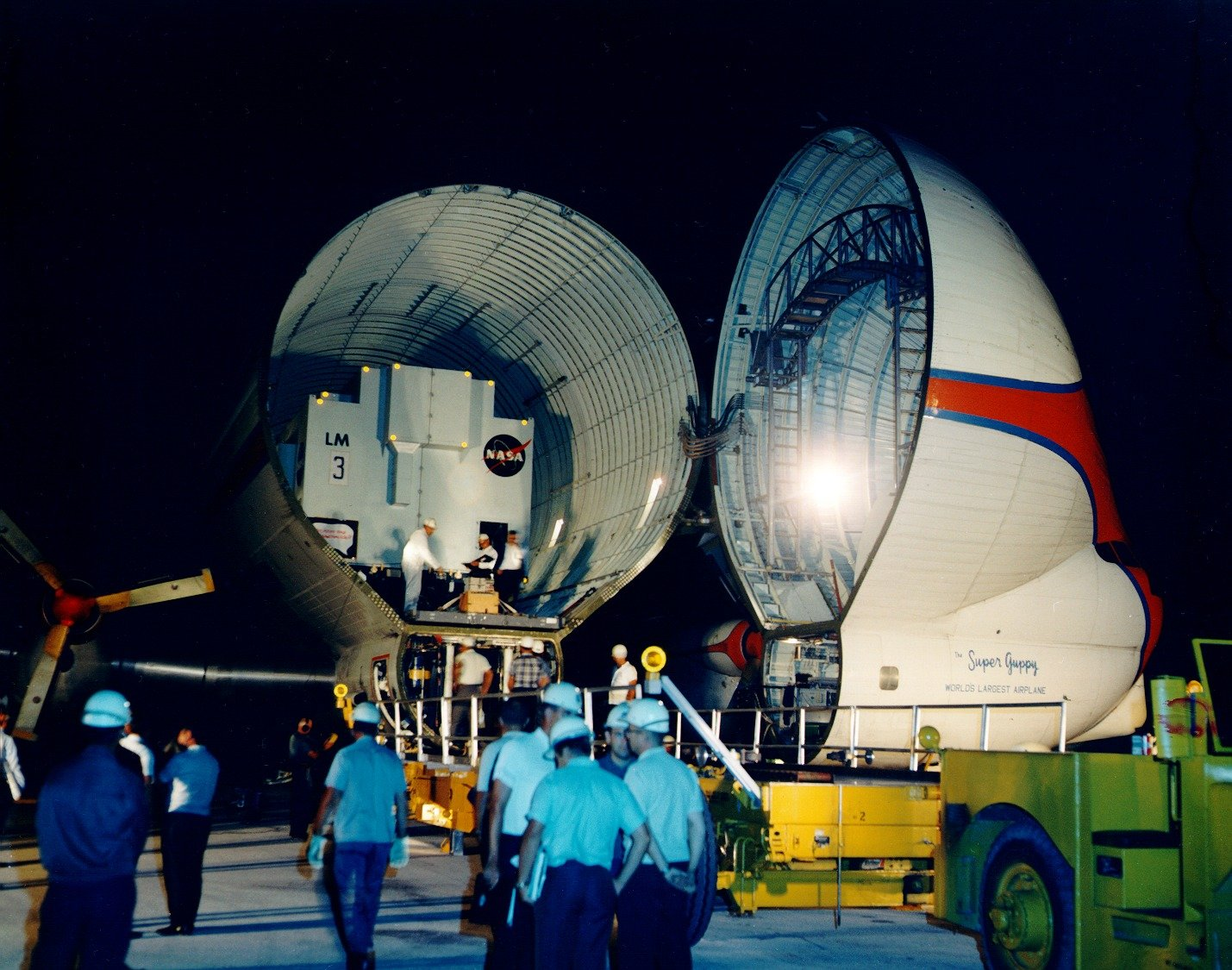
LM-3 arrives at KSC, June 1968

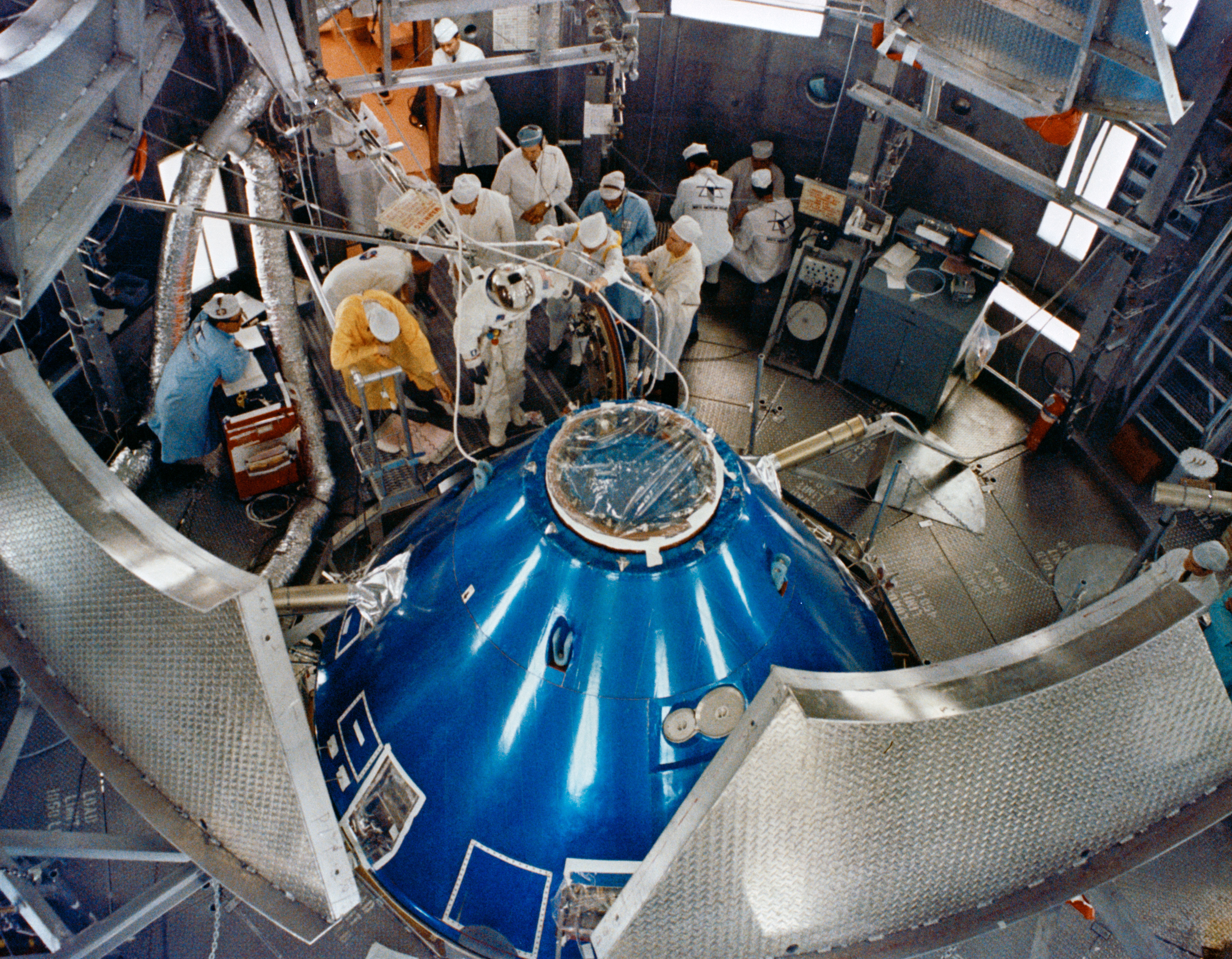
Apollo 9 backup crew training in Gumdrop

=== Life Support System backpack ===
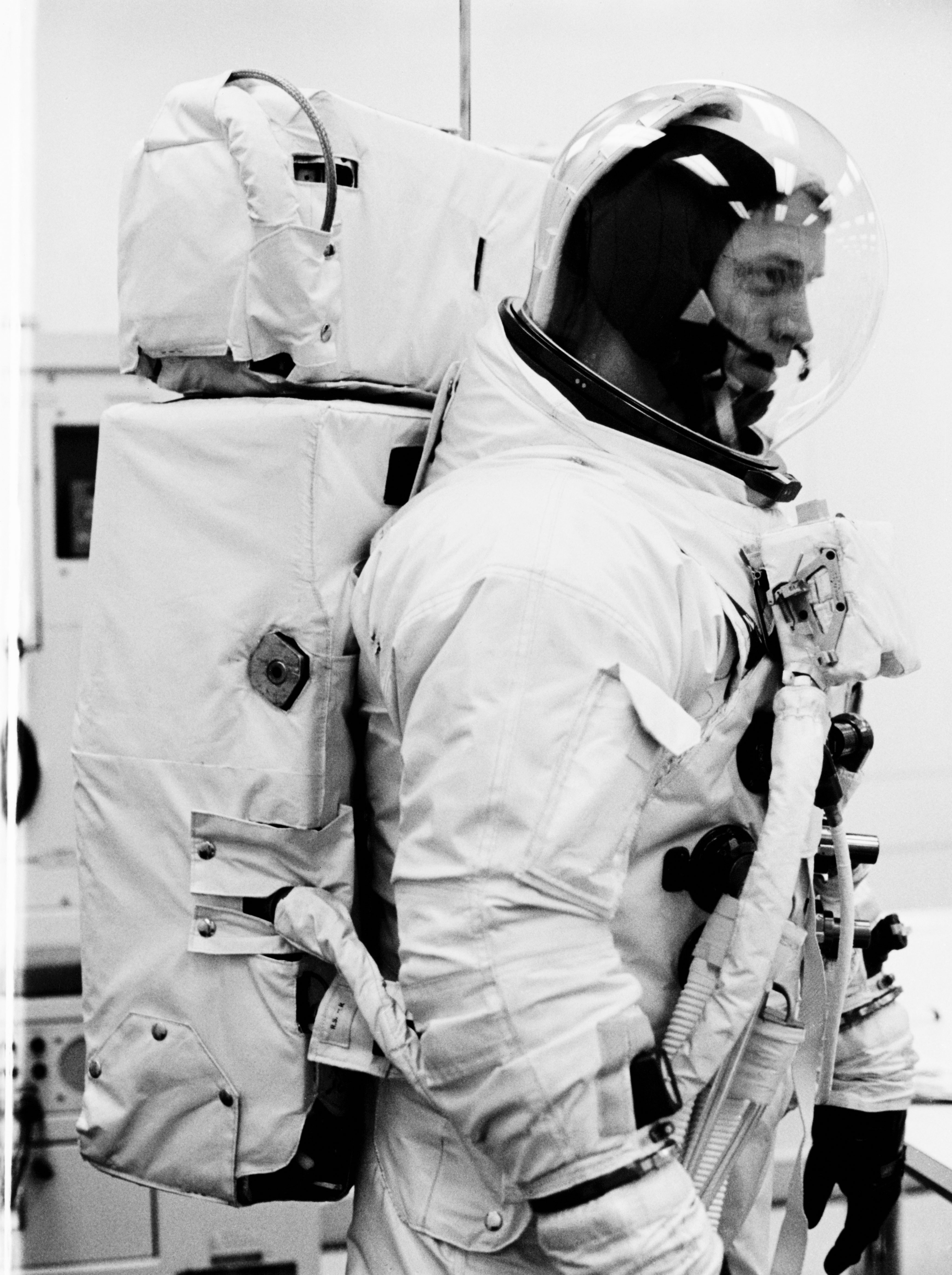
Schweickart with the life support backpack

The Extravehicular Mobility Unit (EMU) backpack flew for the first time on Apollo 9, used by Schweickart during his EVA. This included the Portable Life Support System (PLSS), providing oxygen to the astronaut and water for the Liquid Cooling Garment (LCG), which helped prevent overheating during extravehicular activity. Also present was the Oxygen Purge System (OPS), the "bedroll" atop the backpack, which could provide oxygen for up to roughly an hour if the PLSS failed. A more advanced version of the EMU was used for the lunar landing on Apollo 11.

During his stand-up EVA, (Note: A stand-up EVA is when the astronaut only partially exits the spacecraft.) Scott did not wear a PLSS, but was connected to the CM's life support systems through an umbilical, utilizing a Pressure Control Valve (PCV). This device had been created in 1967 to allow for stand-up EVAs from the hatches of the LM or CM, or for brief ventures outside. It was later used by Scott for his lunar surface stand-up EVA on Apollo 15, and for the cis-lunar EVAs by the command module pilots of the final three Apollo flights.

== Mission highlights ==
=== First through fifth days (March 3–7) ===
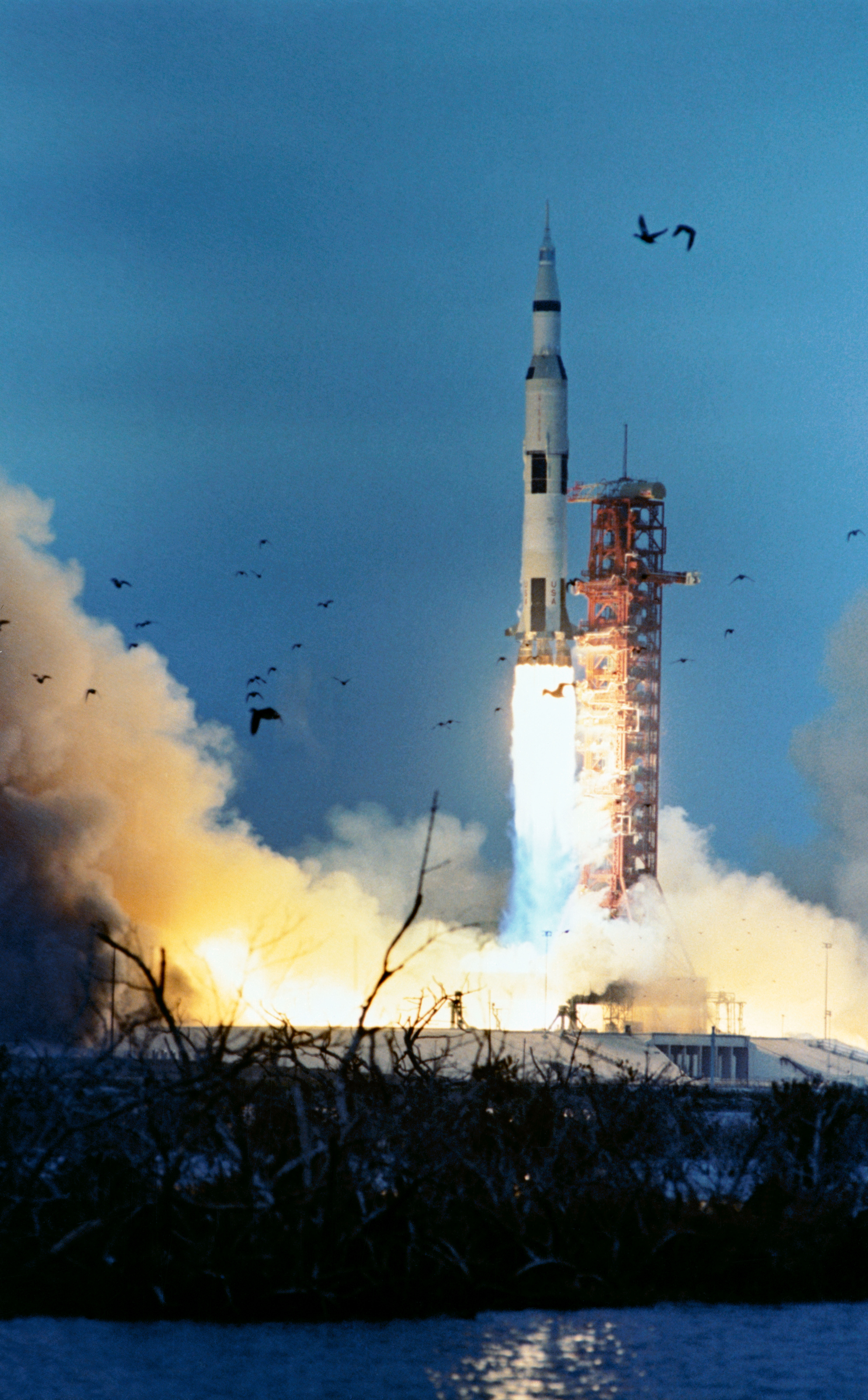
Apollo 9 launches from Kennedy Space Center, March 3, 1969

Originally scheduled to launch on February 28, 1969, the liftoff of Apollo 9 was postponed because all three astronauts had colds, and NASA did not want to risk that the mission might be affected. Around-the-clock labor shifts were required to keep the spacecraft in readiness; the delay cost $500,000. The rocket launched from KSC at 11:00:00 EST (16:00:00 GMT) on March 3. This was well within the launch window, which would have remained open for another three and a quarter hours. Present in the firing control room was Vice President Spiro Agnew on behalf of the new Nixon administration.

McDivitt reported a smooth ride during the launch, although there was some vibration and the astronauts were surprised to be pushed forward when the Saturn V's first stage stopped firing, before its second stage took over, when they were pushed back into their couches. Each of the first two stages slightly underperformed; a deficiency made up, more or less, by the S-IVB third stage. Once the third stage cut out at 00:11:04.7 into the mission, Apollo 9 had entered a parking orbit of 102.3 by 103.9 miles (164.6 by 167.2 km).

The crew began their first major orbital task with the separation of the CSM from the S-IVB at 02:41:16 into the mission, seeking to turn around and then dock with the LM, which was on the end of the S-IVB, after which the combined spacecraft would separate from the rocket. If it was not possible to perform such a docking on a later mission, a lunar landing could not take place. It was Scott's responsibility to fly the CSM, which he did to a successful docking, as the probe-and-drogue docking assembly worked properly. After McDivitt and Schweickart inspected the tunnel connecting the CM and LM, the assembled spacecraft separated from the S-IVB. The next task was to demonstrate that two docked spacecraft could be maneuvered by one engine. A five-second burn took place at 05:59.01.1 into the mission, accomplished with the SM's Service Propulsion System (SPS), after which Scott excitedly reported the LM was still in place. The S-IVB was fired again to send itself into solar orbit.

Apollo spacecraft configuration with CSM (right) and LM docked I - Lunar module descent stage; II - Lunar module ascent stage; III - Command module; IV - Service module. 1 LM descent engine skirt; 2 LM landing gear; 3 LM ladder; 4 Egress platform; 5 Forward hatch; 6 LM reaction control system quad; 7 S-band inflight antenna (2); 8 Rendezvous radar antenna; 9 S-band steerable antenna; 10 Command Module crew compartment; 11 Electrical power system radiators; 12 SM reaction control system quad; 13 Environmental control system radiator; 14 S-band steerable

From 09:00:00 to 19:30:00, a sleep period was scheduled. The astronauts slept well, but complained of being woken by non-English transmissions. Scott theorized that they were possibly in Chinese. The highlight of the second day in orbit (March 4) was three SPS burns. The initial burn, at 22:12:04.1, lasted 110 seconds, and including swiveling or "gimbaling" the engine to test whether the autopilot could dampen the induced oscillations, which it did within five seconds. Two more SPS burns followed, lightening the SM's fuel load. The spacecraft and engine passed every test, sometimes proving more robust than expected. The performance of the CSM in remaining stable while the engine was being gimbaled would, in 1972, help McDivitt, by then manager of the Apollo Spacecraft Program, to approve the continuation of the Apollo 16 mission when its CSM experienced an unstable gimbal after separation from its LM in lunar orbit.

The flight plan for the third day was to have the commander and lunar module pilot enter the LM to check out its systems and use its descent engine to move the entire spacecraft. The descent engine was the backup to the SPS; the ability to use it in this manner later proved critical during the Apollo 13 mission. The flight plan was thrown into question when Schweickart, suffering from space adaptation sickness, vomited, while McDivitt felt queasy as well. They had been avoiding sudden physical motions, but the contortion-like maneuvers to don their space suits for the LM checkout caused them to feel ill. The experience taught the doctors enough about the sickness to have astronauts avoid it during the lunar landings but, at the time, Schweickart feared his vomiting might endanger President Kennedy's goal. They were well enough to continue and entered the LM, thus transferring between vehicles for the first time in the US space program, and making the first transfer without needing to spacewalk, as Soviet cosmonauts had done. The hatches were then closed, though the modules remained docked, showing that Spider's communications and life support systems would work in isolation from those of Gumdrop. On command, the landing legs sprang into the position they would assume for landing on the Moon.

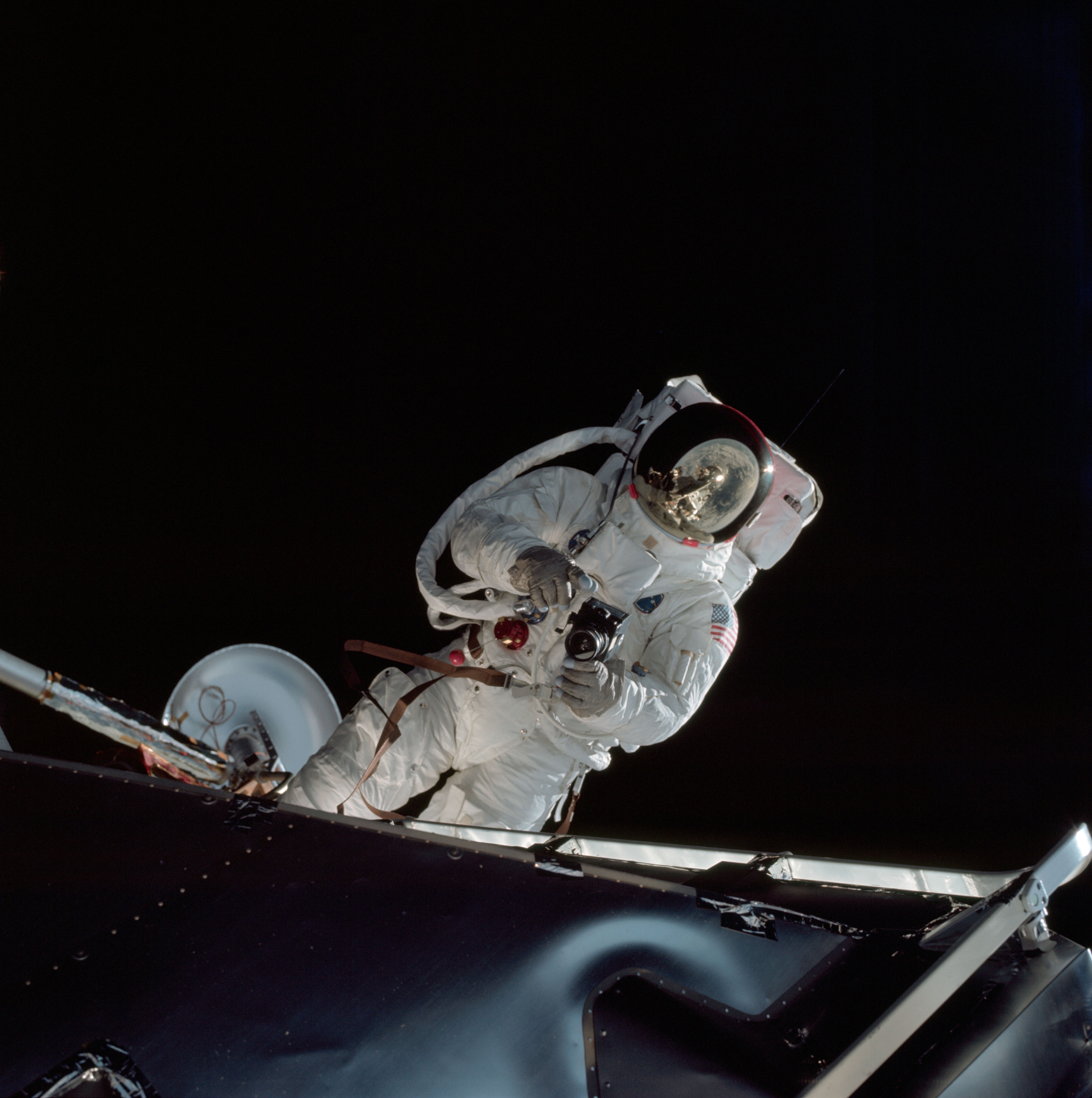
Schweickart during his EVA, photographed by Scott standing up in the command module hatch

In the LM, Schweickart vomited again, causing McDivitt to request a private channel to the doctors in Houston. The first episode had not been reported to the ground because of its brief nature, and when the media learned what had happened to Schweickart, there were "repercussions and a spate of unfriendly stories". They finished the LM checkout, including the successful firing of the descent engine, and returned to Scott in Gumdrop. The burn lasted 367 seconds and simulated the throttle pattern to be used during the landing on the Moon. After they returned, a fifth firing of the SPS was made, designed to circularize Apollo 9's orbit in preparation for the rendezvous. This took place at 54:26:12.3, raising the craft's orbit to 142 by 149 miles (229 by 240 km).

The fourth day's program (March 6) was for Schweickart to exit the hatch on the LM and make his way along the outside of the spacecraft to the CM's hatch, where Scott would stand by to assist, demonstrating that this could be done in the event of an emergency. Schweickart was to wear the life support backpack, or PLSS, to be worn on the lunar surface EVAs. This was the only EVA scheduled before the lunar landing, and thus the only opportunity to test the PLSS in space. McDivitt initially canceled the EVA due to Schweickart's condition, but with the lunar module pilot feeling better, decided to allow him to exit the LM, and once he was there, to move around the LM's exterior using handholds. Scott stood in the CM's hatch; both men photographed each other and retrieved experiments from the exterior of their vehicles. Schweickart found moving around easier than it had been in simulations; both he and Scott were confident that Schweickart could have completed the exterior transfer if called upon to do so, but considered it unnecessary. During the EVA, Schweickart used the call sign "Red Rover", a nod to the color of his hair.

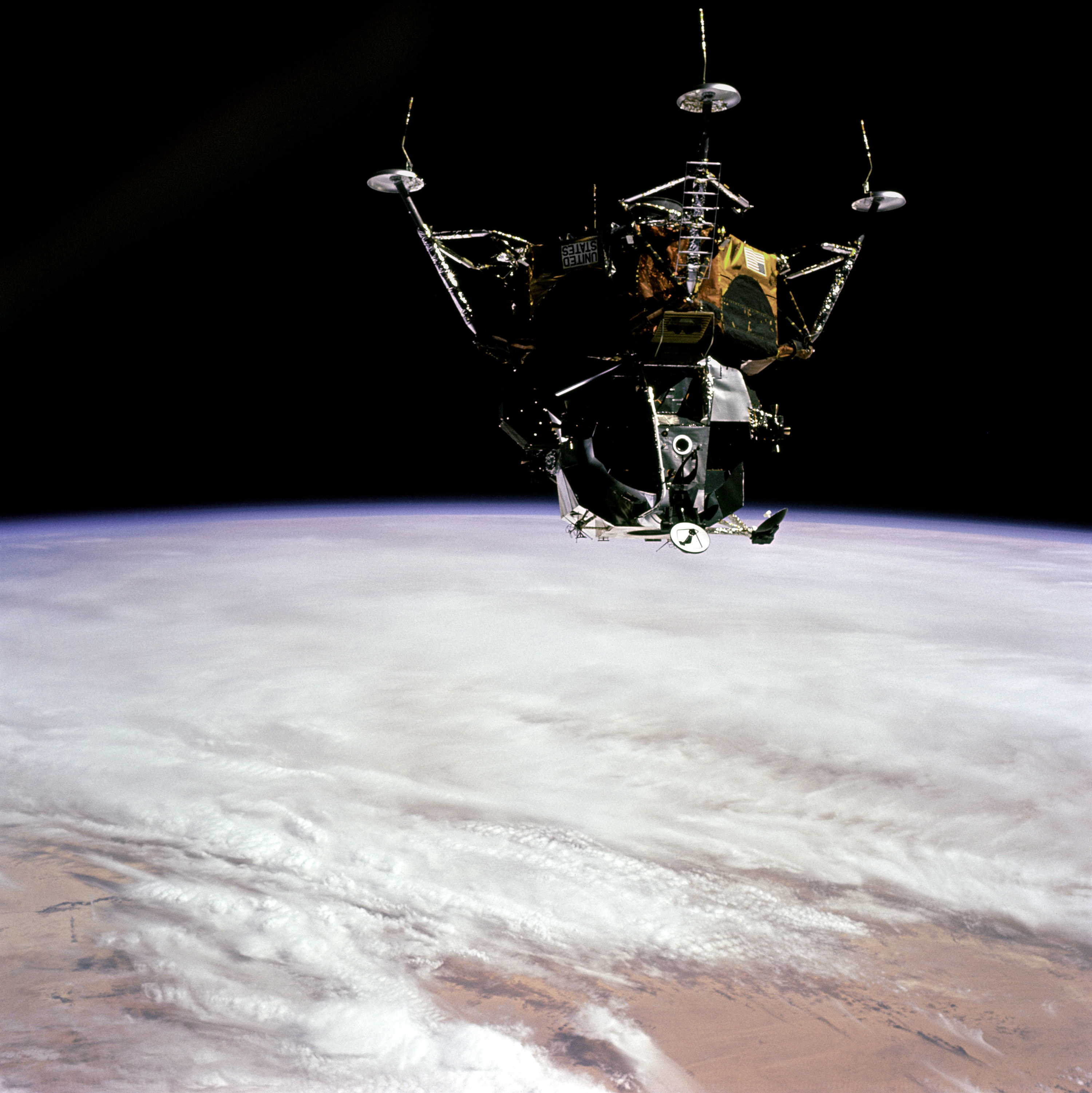
Apollo 9 LM Spider

On March 7, the fifth day, came "the key event of the entire mission: the separation and rendezvous of the lunar module and the command module". The lunar module lacked the capability to return the astronauts to Earth; this was the first time space travelers had flown in a vehicle that could not take them home. McDivitt and Schweickart entered the LM early, having obtained permission to do so without wearing their helmets and gloves, making it easier to set up the LM. When Scott in Gumdrop pushed the button to release the LM, it initially hung on the latches at the end of the docking probe, but he hit the button again and Spider was released. After spending about 45 minutes near Gumdrop, Spider went into a slightly higher orbit, meaning that over time, the two craft would separate, with Gumdrop ahead. Over the next hours, McDivitt fired the LM's descent engine at several throttle settings; by the end of the day the LM was thoroughly test-flown. At a distance of 115 miles (185 km), Spider fired to lower its orbit and thus began to catch up with Gumdrop, a process that took over two hours, and the descent stage was jettisoned.

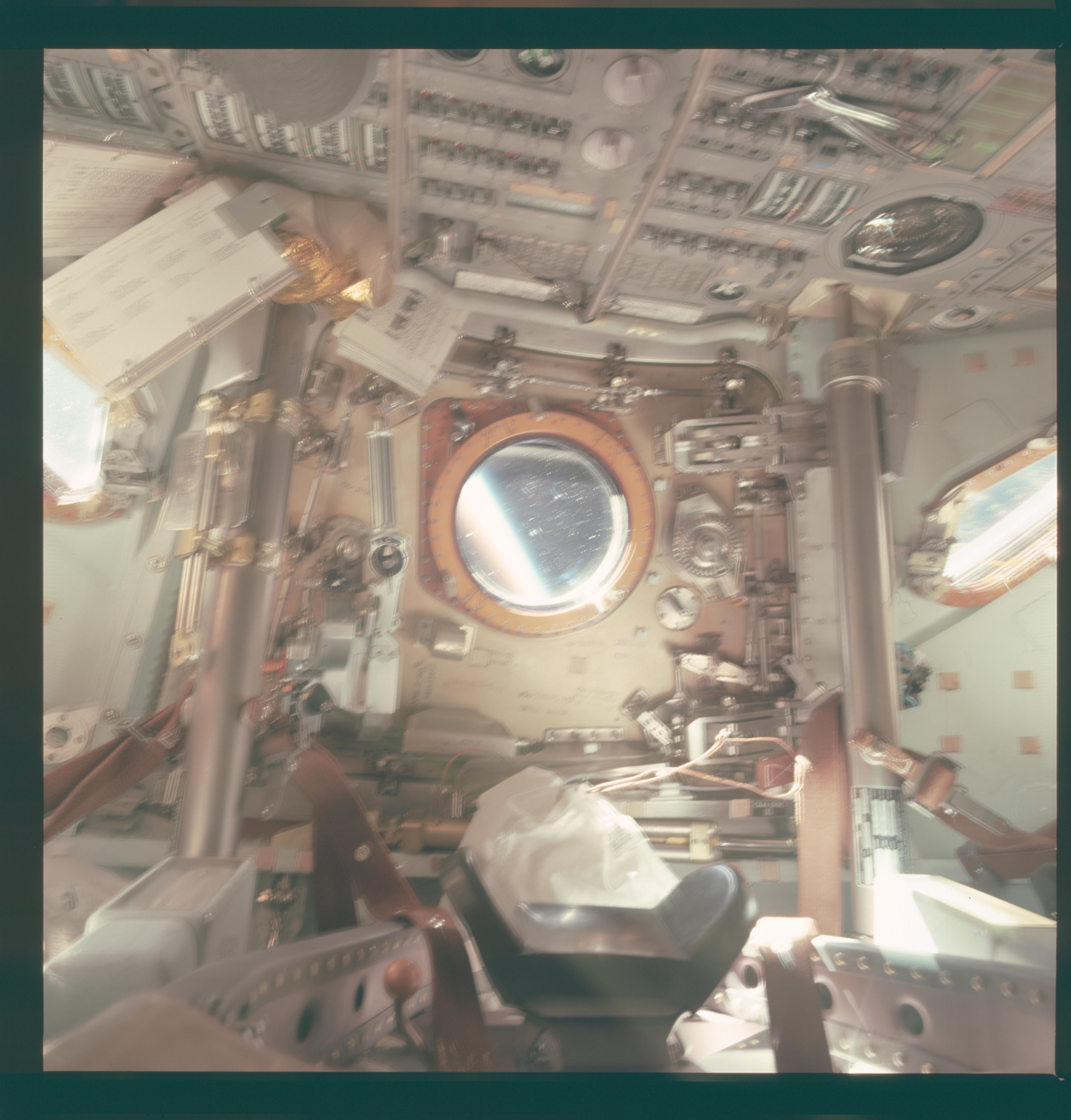
The interior of Gumdrop. View is "up" from the CMP's couch (headrest visible on the picture's bottom), the CM's main control panel is on the top of the picture (viewed "upside down".)

The approach and rendezvous were conducted as near as possible to what was planned for the lunar missions. To demonstrate that rendezvous could be performed by either craft, Spider was the active party during the maneuver. McDivitt brought Spider close to Gumdrop, then maneuvered the LM to show each side to Scott, allowing him to inspect for any damage. Then, McDivitt docked the craft. Due to glare from the Sun, he had trouble doing this and Scott guided him in. During the later missions, the job of docking the two spacecraft in lunar orbit would fall to the command module pilot. After McDivitt and Schweickart returned to Gumdrop, Spider was jettisoned, its engine fired remotely to fuel depletion by Mission Control as part of further testing of the engine, simulating an ascent stage's climb from the lunar surface. This raised Spider to an orbit with apogee of over 3,700 nautical miles (6,900 km; 4,300 mi). The only major lunar module system not fully tested was the landing radar, as this could not be done in Earth orbit.

=== Sixth through eleventh days (March 8–13) ===
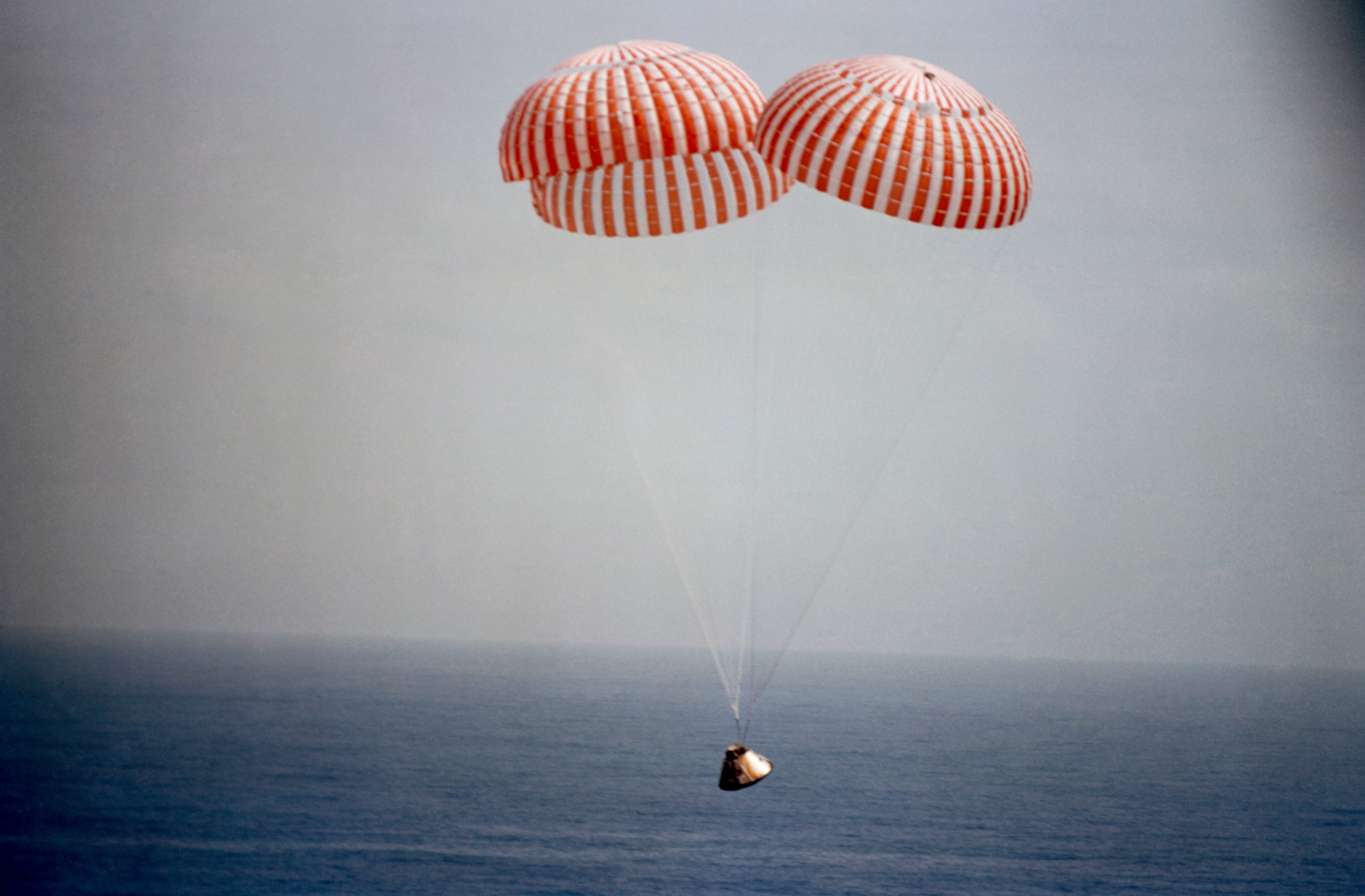
Apollo 9 approaches splashdown in the Atlantic Ocean, March 13, 1969

Apollo 9 was to remain in space for about ten days to check how the CSM would perform over the period of time required for a lunar mission. Most major events had been scheduled for the first days so that they would be accomplished if the flight needed to be ended early. The remaining days in orbit were to be conducted at a more leisurely pace. With the main goals of the mission accomplished, the hatch window was used for special photography of Earth, using four identical Hasselblad cameras, coupled together and using film sensitive to different parts of the electromagnetic spectrum. Such photography allowed different features of the Earth's surface to appear, for example, tracking of water pollution as it exits mouths of rivers into the sea, and the highlighting of agricultural areas using infrared. The camera system was a prototype, and would pave the way for the Earth Resources Technology Satellite, predecessor to the Landsat series. The photography was successful, as the ample time in orbit meant the crew could wait to allow cloud cover to pass, and would inform Skylab's mission planning.

Scott used a sextant to track landmarks on the Earth, and turned the instrument to the skies to observe the planet Jupiter, practicing navigation techniques that were to be used on later missions. The crew was able to track the Pegasus 3 satellite (launched in 1965) as well as the ascent stage of Spider. The sixth burn of the SPS engine took place on the sixth day, though it was postponed one orbit as the reaction control system (RCS) thruster burn needed to settle the reactants in their tanks was not properly programmed. The SPS burn lowered the perigee of Apollo 9's orbit, allowing for improved RCS thruster deorbit capability as a backup to the SPS.

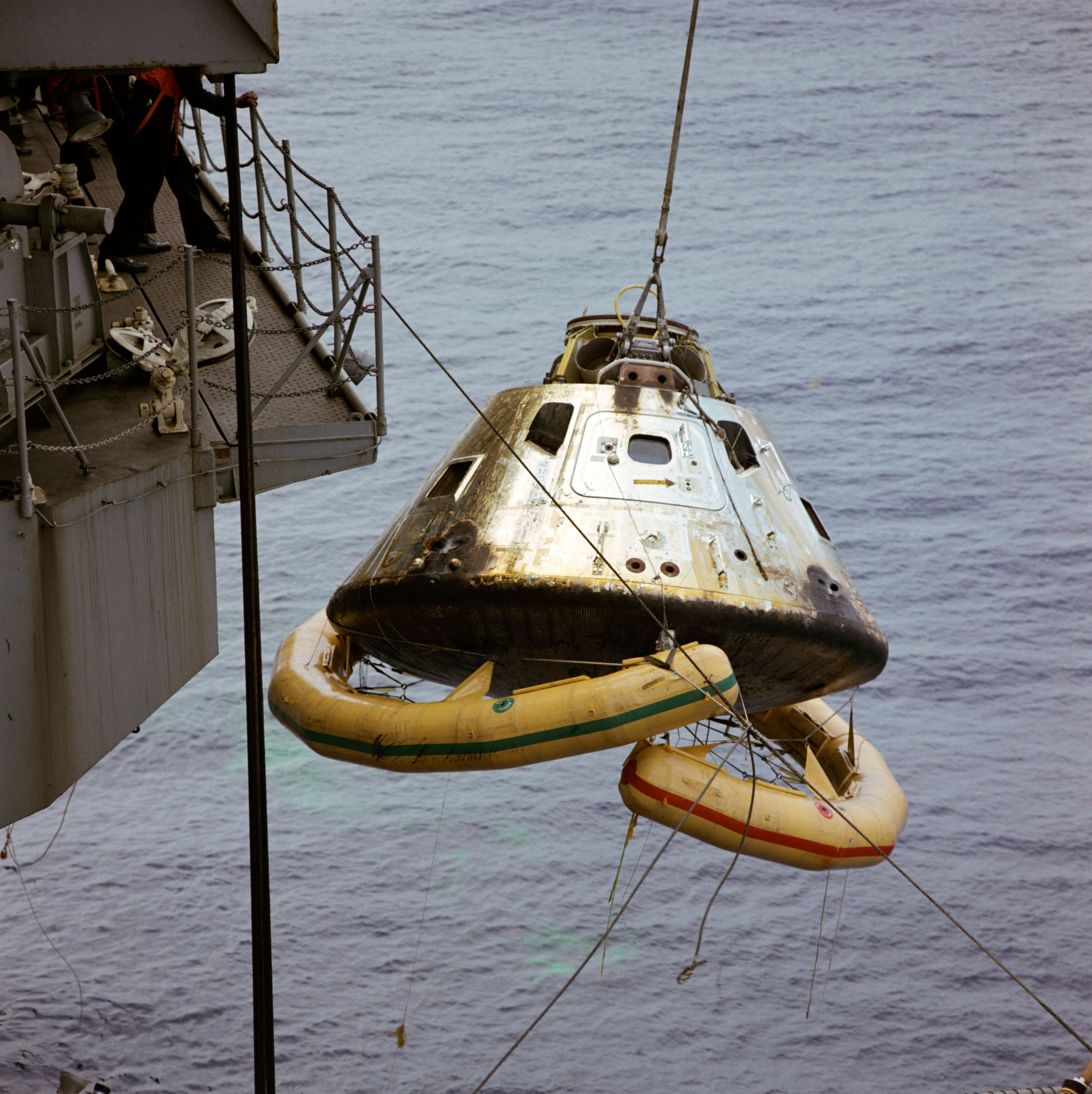
Gumdrop is hoisted aboard the USS Guadalcanal

Considerable testing of the CSM took place, but this was principally Scott's responsibility, allowing McDivitt and Schweickart leisure to observe the Earth; they alerted Scott if anything particularly noteworthy was upcoming, letting him leave his work for a moment to look at Earth too. The seventh burn of the SPS system took place on the eighth day, March 10; its purpose was again to aid RCS deorbit capability, as well as extending Gumdrop's orbital lifetime. It shifted the apogee of the orbit to the Southern Hemisphere, allowing for a longer free-fall time to entry when Apollo 9 returned to Earth. The burn was extended to allow for testing of the propellent gaging system, which had been behaving anomalously during earlier SPS burns. Once it was accomplished, Apollo 9's RCS thrusters could have returned it to Earth and still allowed it to land in the primary recovery zone had the SPS engine failed. The eighth and final SPS burn, to return the vehicle to Earth, was accomplished on March 13, less than an hour after the ten-day mark of the mission, after which the service module was jettisoned. The landing was delayed one orbit because of unfavorable weather in the primary landing zone some 220 nautical miles (410 km; 250 mi) ESE of Bermuda. Instead, Apollo 9 splashed down 160 nautical miles (300 km; 180 mi) east of the Bahamas, about 3 miles (4.8 km) from the recovery carrier, the USS Guadalcanal, after a mission lasting 10 days, 1 hour, 54 seconds. Apollo 9 was the last spacecraft to splash down in the Atlantic Ocean for a half century, until the Crew Dragon Demo-1 mission in 2019, and last crewed splashdown in the Atlantic until Inspiration4 in 2021.

== Hardware disposition ==
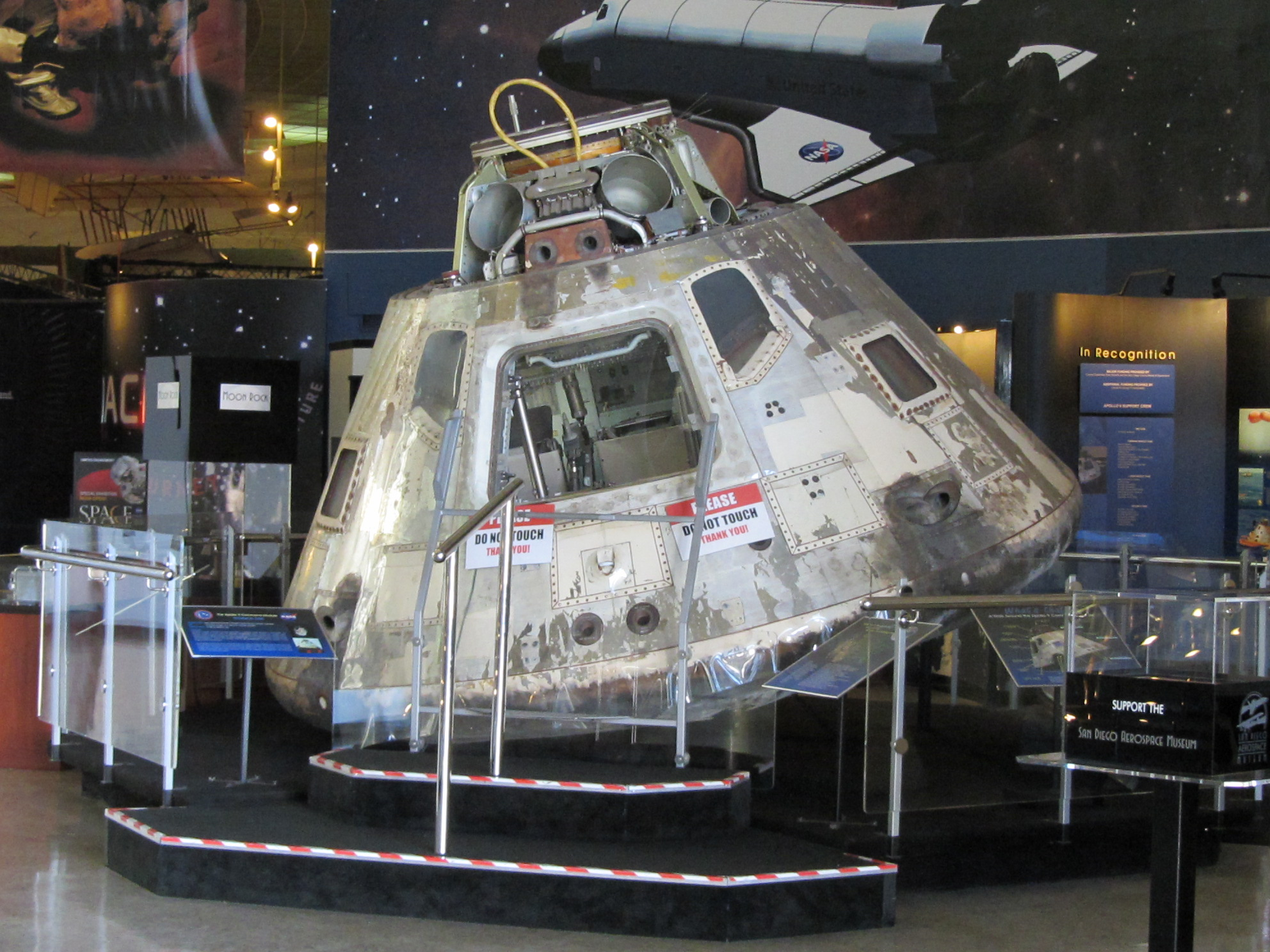
Gumdrop at the San Diego Air & Space Museum

The Apollo 9 Command Module Gumdrop (1969-018A) is on display at the San Diego Air & Space Museum. Gumdrop was formerly displayed at the Michigan Space and Science Center, Jackson, Michigan, until April 2004, when the center closed. The service module, jettisoned shortly after the deorbit burn, reentered the atmosphere and disintegrated.

The ascent stage of LM-3 Spider (1969-018C) reentered on October 23, 1981. The descent stage of LM-3 Spider (1969-018D) reentered on March 22, 1969, landing in the Indian Ocean near North Africa. The S-IVB (1969-018B) was sent into solar orbit, with initial aphelion of 80,093,617 miles (128,898,182 km), perihelion of 44,832,845 miles (72,151,470 km) and orbital period of 245 days. It remains in solar orbit as of 2020.

== Appraisal and aftermath ==
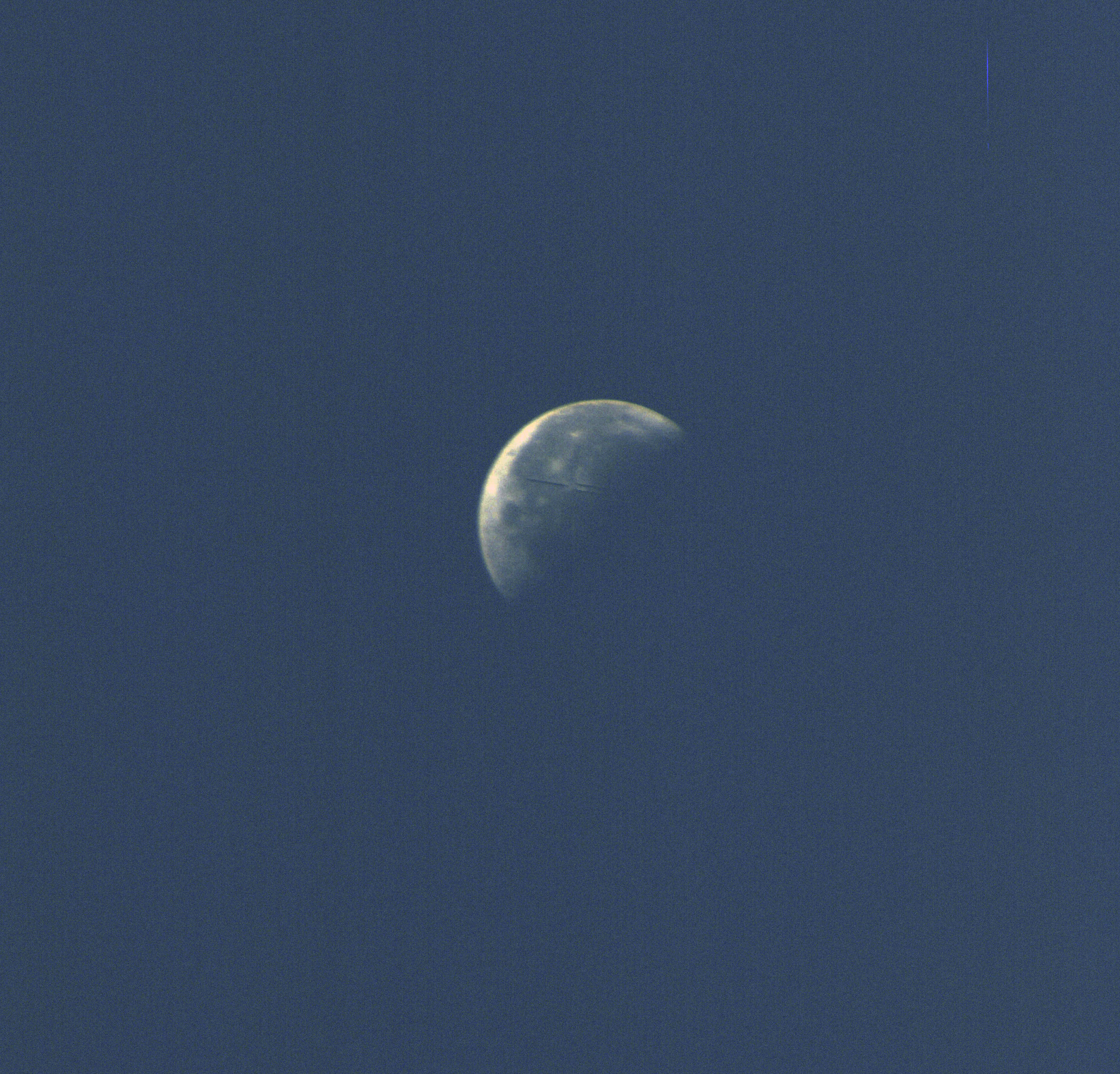
Image of the Moon taken from Apollo 9

As NASA Associate Administrator George Mueller put it, "Apollo 9 was as successful a flight as any of us could ever wish for, as well as being as successful as any of us have ever seen." Gene Kranz called Apollo 9 "sheer exhilaration". Apollo Program Director Samuel C. Phillips stated, "in every way, it has exceeded even our most optimistic expectations." Apollo 11 astronaut Buzz Aldrin stood in Mission Control as Spider and Gumdrop docked after their separate flights, and with the docking, according to Andrew Chaikin, "Apollo 9 had fulfilled all its major objectives. At that moment, Aldrin knew Apollo 10 would also succeed, and that he and Armstrong would attempt to land on the Moon. On March 24, NASA made it official."

Although he might have been offered command of an Apollo lunar landing mission, McDivitt chose to leave the Astronaut Corps after Apollo 9, becoming manager of the Apollo Spacecraft Program later in 1969. Scott was soon given another spaceflight assignment as backup commander of Apollo 12, and then was made mission commander of Apollo 15, landing on the Moon in 1971. Schweickart volunteered for medical investigation of his spacesickness, but was unable to shake its stigma, and was never again assigned to a prime crew. He took a leave of absence from NASA in 1977 that eventually became permanent. Eugene Cernan, commander of Apollo 17, stated that when it came to understanding spacesickness, Schweickart "paid the price for them all".

Following the success of Apollo 9, NASA did not conduct the "E mission" (further testing in medium Earth orbit), and even considered skipping the "F mission", the dress rehearsal for the lunar landing, going straight to the landing attempt. As the spacecraft designated for the first landing attempt were still being assembled, this was not done. NASA officials also felt that given the past difficulties with the LM, there was a need for a further test flight before the actual landing attempt, and that orbiting the Moon would give them the opportunity to study mass concentrations there, which had affected Apollo 8's orbit. According to French and Burgess in their study of the Apollo program, "Apollo 9's success had ensured that the next Apollo mission would go back to the moon."

== See also ==
- List of spacewalks and moonwalks 1965–1999
