= Primary life support system =

Life support device for a space suit

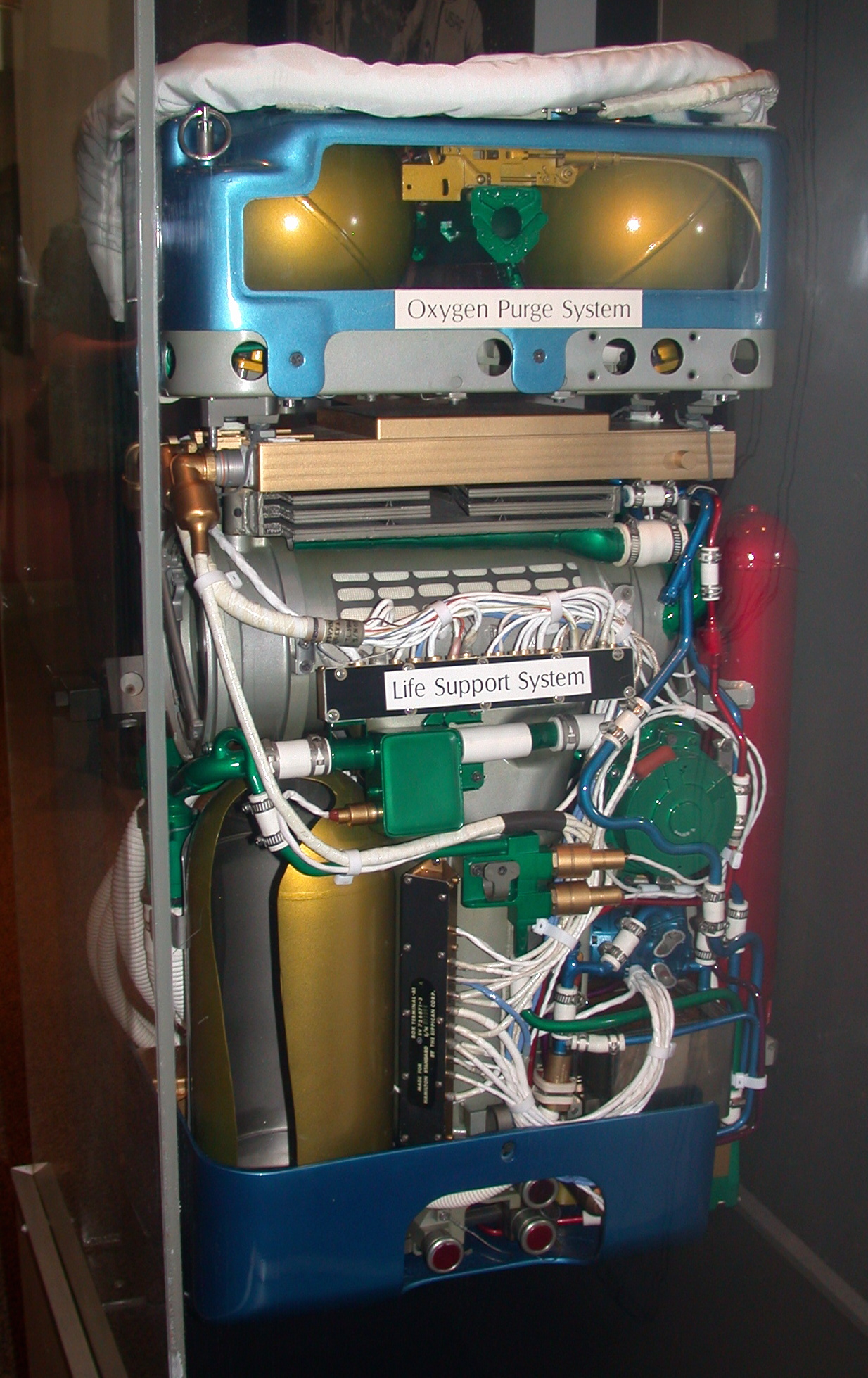
A portable life support system from the Apollo A7L suit, with its outer cover removed

A primary (or portable or personal) life support system (or subsystem) (PLSS), is a device connected to an astronaut or cosmonaut's spacesuit, which allows extra-vehicular activity (EVA) with maximum freedom, independent of a spacecraft's life support system. A PLSS is generally worn like a backpack. The functions performed by the PLSS include:

- Regulating suit pressure
- Providing breathable oxygen
- Removing carbon dioxide, humidity, odors, and contaminants from breathing oxygen
- Cooling and recirculating oxygen through the pressure garment, and water through a Liquid Cooling and Ventilation Garment or Liquid Cooling Garment.
- Two-way voice communication
- Display or telemetry of suit health parameters
- Telemetry of an indicator of the wearer's immediate health (e.g. heart rate)

The air handling function of a PLSS is similar to that of a diving rebreather, in that exhaled gases are recycled into the breathing gas in a closed loop.

When used in a microgravity environment, a separate propulsion system is generally needed for safety and control, since there is no physical connection to a spacecraft.

== Apollo PLSS ==
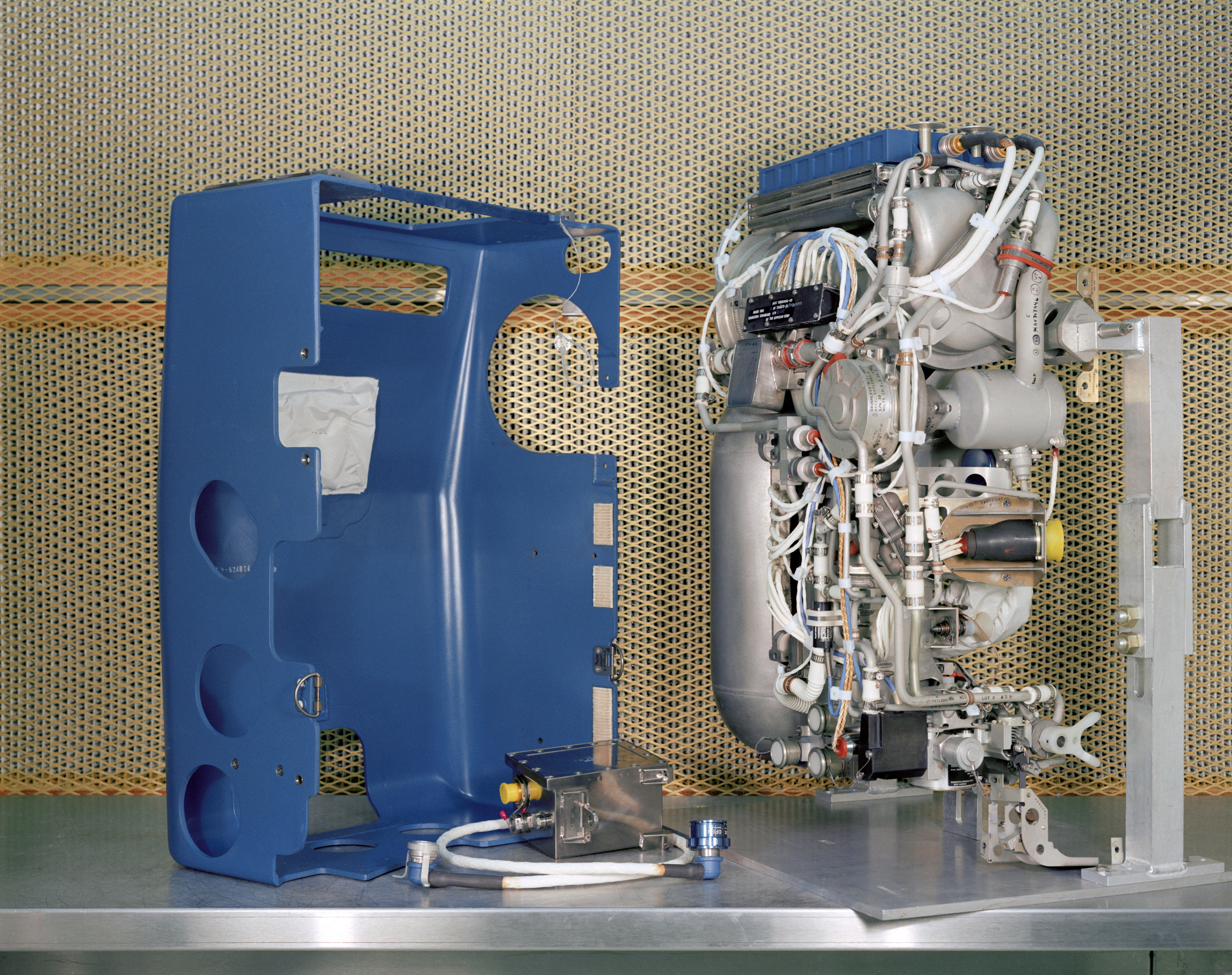
The interior of the Apollo PLSS

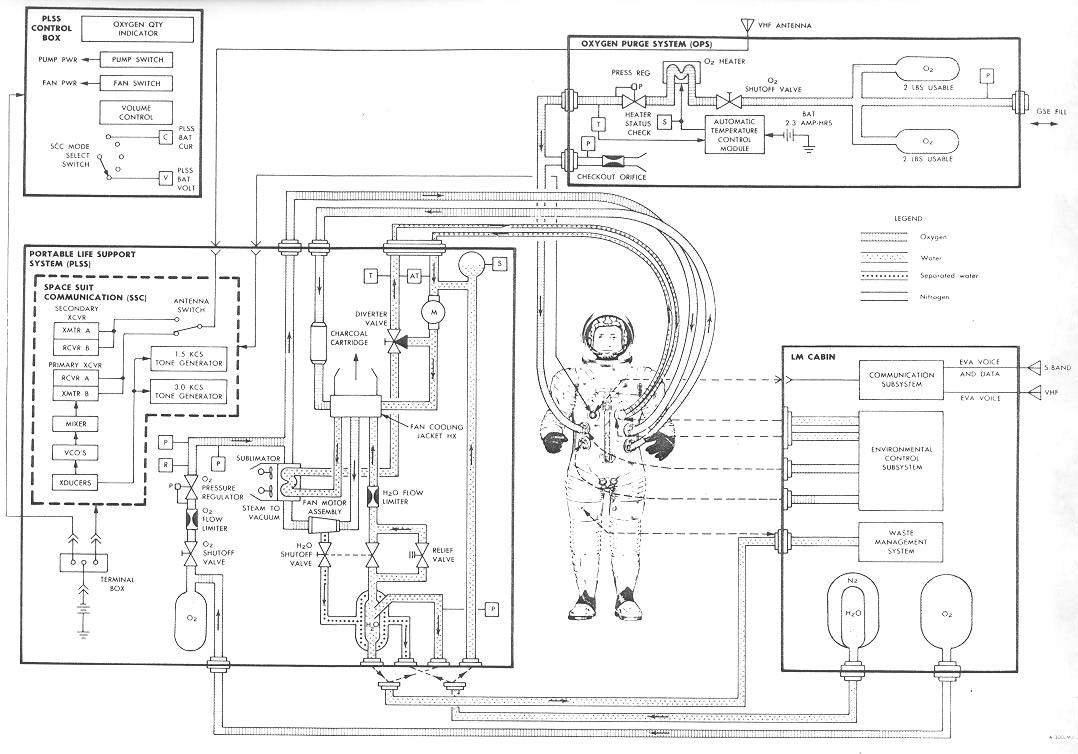
Diagram of the A7L PLSS and OPS, with interfaces to the astronaut and the Lunar Module cabin

The portable life support system used in the Apollo lunar landing missions used lithium hydroxide to remove the carbon dioxide from the breathing air, and circulated water in an open loop through a liquid-cooled garment, expelling the water into space, where it turned to ice crystals. Some of the water was also used to remove excess heat from the astronaut's breathing air, and collected for dumping into the spacecraft's wastewater tank after an EVA. The PLSS also contained a radio transceiver and antenna for communications, which were relayed through the spacecraft's communication system to Earth. PLSS controls were provided in the Remote Control Unit (RCU) mounted on the astronaut's chest. Oxygen and water were rechargeable for multiple EVAs from the spacecraft's environmental control system.

Lunar surface EVA times for the first four missions (Apollo 11 through 14) were limited to 4 hours, with oxygen stored at 1,020 pounds per square inch (7.0 MPa), 3.0 pounds (1.4 kg) of lithium hydroxide, 8.5 pounds (3.9 liters) of cooling water, and a 279 watt-hour battery. For the extended missions of Apollo 15 through 17, the EVA stay time was doubled to 8 hours by increasing oxygen to 1,430 pounds per square inch (9.9 MPa), lithium hydroxide to 3.12 pounds (1.42 kg), cooling water to 11.5 pounds (5.2 liters), and battery capacity to 390 watt-hours.

An emergency backup was provided in case the main system failed, by a separate unit called the Oxygen Purge System (OPS), mounted on top of the PLSS, immediately behind the astronaut's helmet. The OPS maintained suit pressure and removed carbon dioxide, heat and water vapor through a continuous, one-way air flow vented to space. When activated, the OPS provided oxygen to a separate inlet on the pressure suit, once a vent valve on a separate suit outlet was manually opened. The OPS provided a maximum of about 30 minutes of emergency oxygen for breathing and cooling. This could be extended to 75 to 90 minutes with a "buddy system" hose that used the other astronaut's functional PLSS for cooling (only). This allowed the vent valve to be partly closed to decrease the oxygen flow rate.

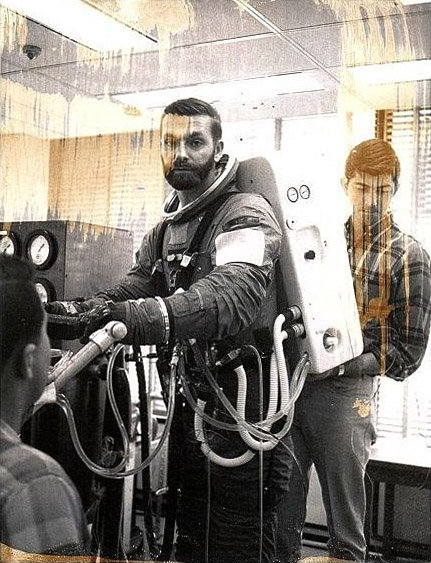
James P. Lucas testing the PLSS at Houston Flight Center

The PLSS was 26 inches (66 cm) high, 18 inches (46 cm) wide, and 10 inches (25 cm) deep. It was tested at the Houston Flight Center by James P. Lucas, working for Hamilton Standard, and by various astronauts in neutral buoyancy tanks at Dallas. It was tested in space for the first time by Rusty Schweickart in a stand-up EVA in Earth orbit on Apollo 9. His PLSS weighed 84 pounds (38 kg) on Earth, but only 14 lb (equivalent to the Earth weight of 6.4 kg) on the Moon. The OPS weighed 41 pounds (19 kg) on Earth (6.8 lb (equivalent to the Earth weight of 3.1 kg) on the Moon).

== Space Shuttle/International Space Station PLSS ==
Similar systems have been used by Space Shuttle astronauts, and are currently used by International Space Station crews.

The primary life support system for the EMU suit used on the Space Shuttle and International Space Station is manufactured by Hamilton Sundstrand. It is mounted to the back of the Hard Upper Torso (HUT) assembly.

Oxygen (O_{2}), carbon dioxide (CO_{2}) and water vapor are drawn from the extremities of the suit by the liquid cooling and ventilation garment or LCVG, which sends the gas to the PLSS. When gas enters the PLSS, activated charcoal removes odors and lithium hydroxide (LiOH) removes carbon dioxide. Next, the gas passes through a fan which maintains a flow rate of about six cubic feet per minute. A sublimator then condenses water vapor, which is removed by a "slurper" and a rotary separator. The removed water is stored and used to supplement the water supply used in the LCVG. The sublimator also cools the remaining oxygen to about 55 °F (13 °C). A flow sensor monitors the flow rate.

Extra oxygen is added to the flow from a storage tank as necessary, downstream of the flow sensor. The oxygen is then returned to the suit at the back of the head, where it flows down over the astronaut's face. By delivering oxygen to the helmet and drawing gas from the extremities, the suit is designed to ensure that the suit occupant breathes the freshest possible oxygen.

The operating pressure of the space suit is maintained at 4.3 psi (30 kPa) (0.3 atm ~ one third of Earth atmospheric pressure) during extravehicular operations, and 0.7 psi (4.8 kPa) relative to external pressure while in intravehicular mode (i.e., inside the pressurized spacecraft).

== Developing technologies ==
Technologies being considered for application in future PLSSs include pressure swing adsorption (PSA), a process by which CO_{2} can be separated from gas more efficiently, and through a repeatable process, as opposed to the current LiOH canisters, which become saturated with each use, and are limited to around eight hours. By regenenerating the sorbent during EVA, the size and weight of the sorbent canister can be greatly reduced. PSA accomplishes this by venting CO_{2} and water vapor into space.

== See also ==
- Bioregenerative life support system – Artificial ecosystem
- Carbon dioxide scrubber – Device which absorbs carbon dioxide from circulated gas
- Cis-Lunar – Manufacturer of electronically controlled closed-circuit rebreathers for scuba diving
- Gas separation – Techniques to provide multiple products or purify a product
- Rebreather – Portable apparatus to recycle breathing gas
- Spome – Hypothetical matter-closed, energy-open life support system
