= Extravehicular Mobility Unit =

Series of semi-rigid two-piece United States space suit models since 1982

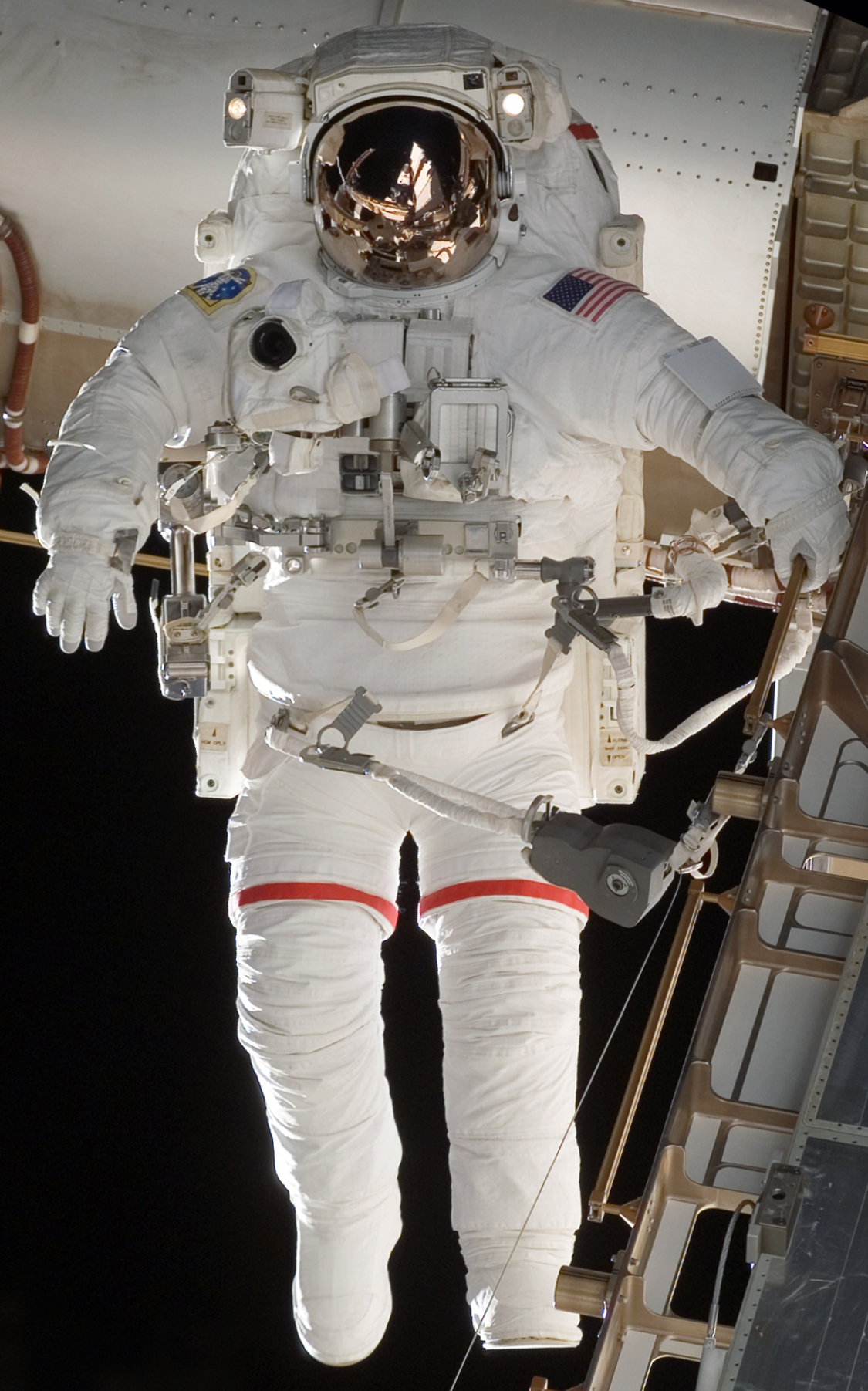
The Enhanced EMU Suit. The suits are white to reflect heat and to stand out against the blackness of space; the red stripes serve to differentiate astronauts.

The Extravehicular Mobility Unit (EMU) is an independent spacesuit that provides environmental protection, mobility, life support, and communications for astronauts performing extravehicular activity (EVA) in Earth orbit. Introduced in 1982, it is a two-piece semi-rigid suit, and is one of two types of EVA spacesuits used by crew members on the International Space Station (ISS), the other being the Russian Orlan space suit. It was used by NASA's Space Shuttle astronauts prior to the end of the Shuttle program in 2011.

== Suit components ==
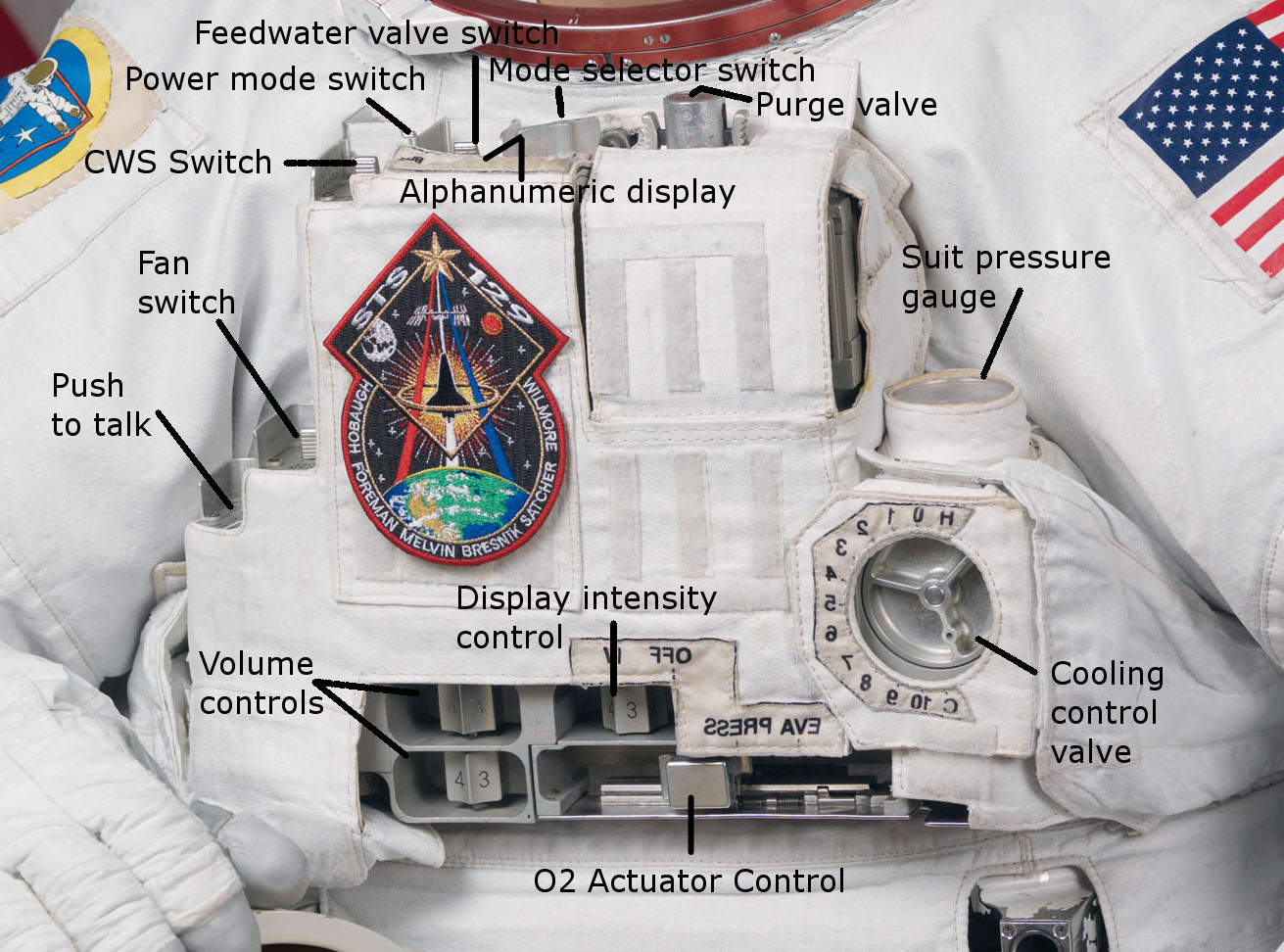
The E.M.U Display and Control Module (DCM).

The EMU, like the Apollo/Skylab A7L spacesuit, was the result of 21 years of research and development. (Note: This length of time is derived from the opening of the contract to develop the Apollo A7L space suit, to the first EVA conducted with the Space Shuttle EMU on STS-6 in 1983.) It consists of a Space Suit Assembly (SSA) assembly which includes the Hard Upper Torso (HUT), arm sections, gloves, an Apollo-style "bubble" helmet, the Extravehicular Visor Assembly (EVVA), and a soft Lower Torso Assembly (LTA), incorporating the Body Seal Closure (BSC), waist bearing, brief, legs, and boots, and a Life Support System (LSS) which incorporates the Primary Life Support System (PLSS), electrical systems, and a Secondary Oxygen Pack (SOP). Prior to donning the pressure garment, the crew member puts on a Maximum Absorbency Garment (MAG) (basically a modified incontinence diaper – Urine Collection Devices (UCDs) are no longer used), and possibly a Thermal Control Undergarment (long johns). The final item donned before putting on the pressure suit is the Liquid Cooling and Ventilation Garment (LCVG), which incorporates clear plastic tubing through which chilled liquid water flows for body temperature control, as well as ventilation tubes for waste gas removal.

After donning the LCVG, the astronaut then puts on the LTA, before entering the airlock. The astronaut then dons the HUT, connects the LCVG umbilical to the umbilical in the HUT, and then locks the two parts of the suit together using the Body Seal Closure. Once the suit is turned on and checked out, the astronaut dons a "Snoopy cap", a brown and white fabric communications cap dating back to the Apollo days, which incorporates a pair of earphones and microphones, allowing the EVA astronaut to communicate with both the crew members in the orbiter and ground controllers in Houston. After donning the "Snoopy cap", the gloves and helmet are then locked on, pressurizing the suit. The suit's regulator and fans activate when the servicing umbilicals are removed and the suit reaches an internal pressure of 4.3 psi (30 kPa). A typical EMU can support an astronaut for 8.5 hours, including 30 minutes of reserves in the case of primary life support failure. To perform an EVA from the shuttle, the cabin pressure was reduced from 14.7 to 10.2 psi (101 to 70 kPa) for 24 hours, after which an astronaut had to pre-breathe for 45 minutes. For EVAs on board the ISS, the astronaut must pre-breathe for about four hours, although since 2006 most ISS EVAs have instead employed a "camp out" procedure where the spacewalk team sleeps in the Quest airlock module while the atmosphere is adjusted.

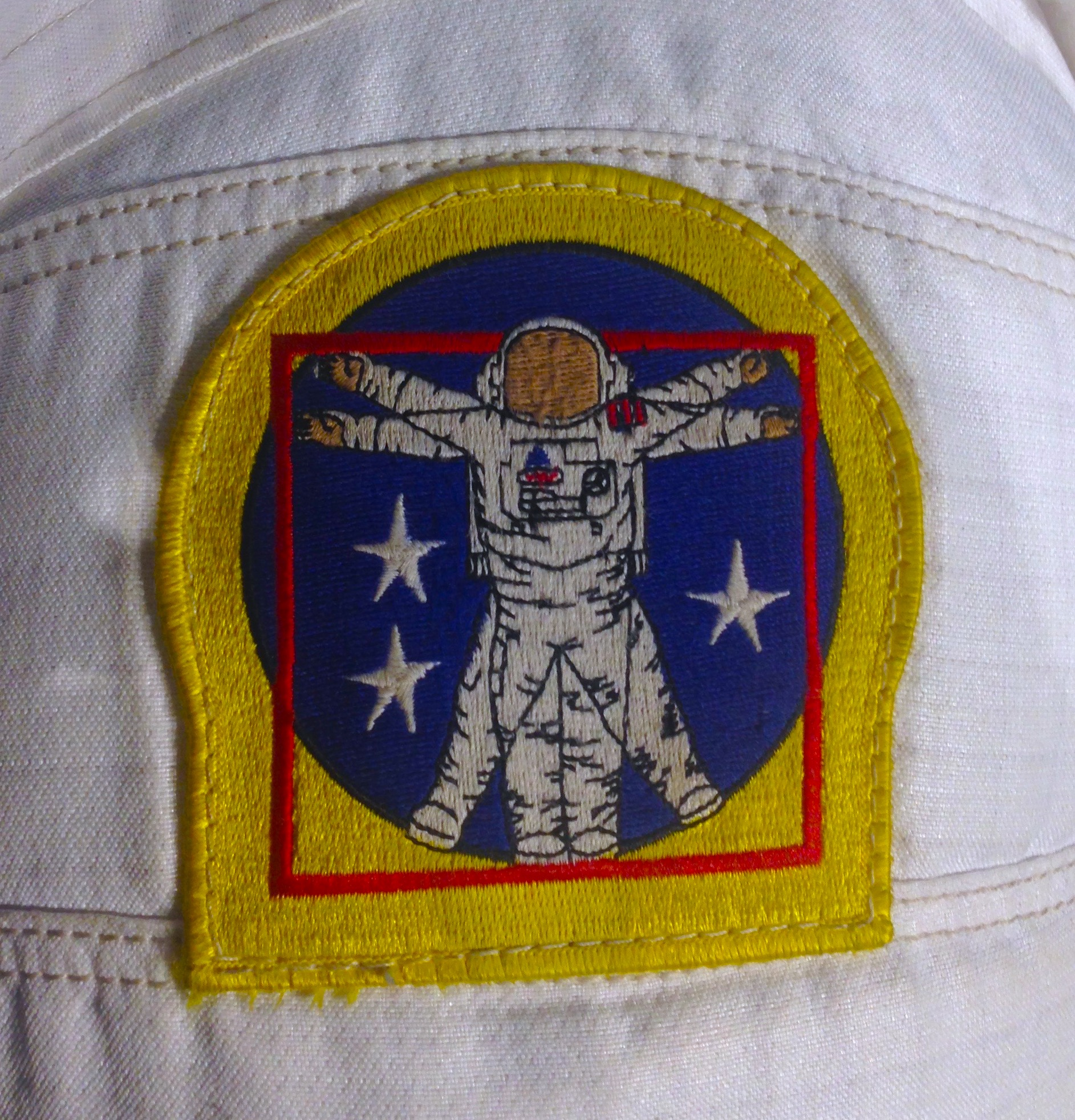
NASA's Extravehicular Mobility Unit Vitruvian Spaceman patch (Space Shuttle version, with three stars representing NASA's human spaceflight programs)

== Specifications ==
=== Baseline EMU ===
- Manufacturer: ILC Dover (suit) and Collins Aerospace (primary life support systems)
- Missions: STS-4 (1982) to STS-110 (2002)
- Function: orbital extra-vehicular activity
- Operating pressure: 4.3 psi (29.6 kPa)
- EVA suit weight: 109 lb (49.4 kg)
- Total shuttle EVA suit weight: 254 lb (115.2 kg)
- Primary life support: 8 hours (480 minutes)
- Backup life support: 30 minutes

=== Enhanced EMU ===
- Manufacturer: ILC Dover (suit), Collins Aerospace (primary life support systems) and NASA (SAFER)
- Missions: since 1998
- Function: orbital extra-vehicular activity
- Operating pressure: 4.3 psi (29.6 kPa)
- EVA suit weight: 122 lb (55.3 kg)
- Total shuttle EVA suit weight: 275 lb (124.7 kg)
- Total ISS EVA suit weight: 319 lb (144.7 kg)
- Primary life support: 8 hours (480 minutes)
- Backup life support: 30 minutes

== Manufacturer ==
The EMU hardware and accessories (PLSS, helmet, communications cap, and locking rings for the helmet and gloves), is manufactured by Hamilton Standard (later the Hamilton Sundstrand division of Collins Aerospace) in Windsor Locks, Connecticut, while the suit's soft components (the arms of the HUT and the entire LTU) are produced by ILC Dover (a former division of Playtex) in Frederica, Delaware. The two companies, who were rivals during the early days of Apollo for the contract to build the "Block II" (moonwalking) space suit, teamed up in 1974 against the David Clark Company and Garrett AiResearch for the EMU development and construction. During Apollo, the ILC Dover-produced A7L used the life support backpack, helmet, and locking rings supplied by Hamilton Standard, but originally, ILC Dover was to just supply the arms and legs of the suit, a similar process that still occurs.

In total 18 EMU suits with PLSS were manufactured; 5 were lost during missions, 1 was lost in ground test, and, as of 2017, 11 remain complete and functional.

== History ==
Upon receiving the contract to build the EMU in 1974, Hamilton Standard and ILC Dover delivered the first EMU units to NASA in 1982. During the research and development phase (1975–1980), a suit being tested caught fire, injuring a technician and forcing a redesign on the regulator and circulation fan. On STS-4 in July 1982, the astronauts practiced donning and doffing the suit in the Shuttle's airlock. The first Shuttle EVA was to occur on STS-5, but an electrical failure on the circulation fan forced the EVA to be cancelled. The first EVA of the new EMU finally occurred on STS-6 when Story Musgrave and Donald Peterson went out in the payload bay of the Space Shuttle Challenger and tested techniques to lower the launch cradle of a solid-fuel upper stage used to boost a Tracking and Data Relay Satellite (TDRS-A) into a geostationary orbit.

Other EVAs followed on the Shuttle, notably those on STS-41-B (the first Manned Maneuvering Unit flight), STS-41-C (the Solar Max repair mission), STS-41-G (the first American EVA involving a woman), and STS-51-A (where two stranded satellites were retrieved and returned to Earth), but the majority of EMU uses occurred on the servicing missions of the Hubble Space Telescope. For those flights, two sets of EVA astronauts would venture out of the orbiter, thus requiring NASA to fly four sets of suits (along with repair parts). 41 EVAs using EMUs had been conducted out of the Space Shuttle airlock prior to the start of ISS assembly in November 1998.

With the building of the ISS, Hamilton Sundstrand and ILC Dover refined the Shuttle EMU by making the suit modular. This allowed an EMU to be left on the ISS for up to two years and resized on-orbit to fit different crew members. The ISS EMUs also have increased battery capacity, the Simplified Aid For EVA Rescue (SAFER), improved cameras and radios, and a new caution and warning system. Another feature is an additional battery to power heaters built into the glove, allowing astronauts to keep their hands warm during nighttime passages on each 95-minute orbit.

The ISS EMUs and the Russian Orlan suits are used by crews of all nationalities on the International Space Station. The two EMUs are stored within the Quest Joint Airlock.

== Future use and replacement ==
As of 2019, NASA plans to use an Exploration Extravehicular Mobility Unit (xEMU) system during the Artemis program, derived from spacesuit technologies used in the past.

On June 1, 2022, NASA announced it had selected Axiom Space and Collins Aerospace to develop and provide astronauts with next generation spacesuit and spacewalk systems to work outside the International Space Station, explore the lunar surface on Artemis missions, and prepare for human missions to Mars.

== Gallery ==
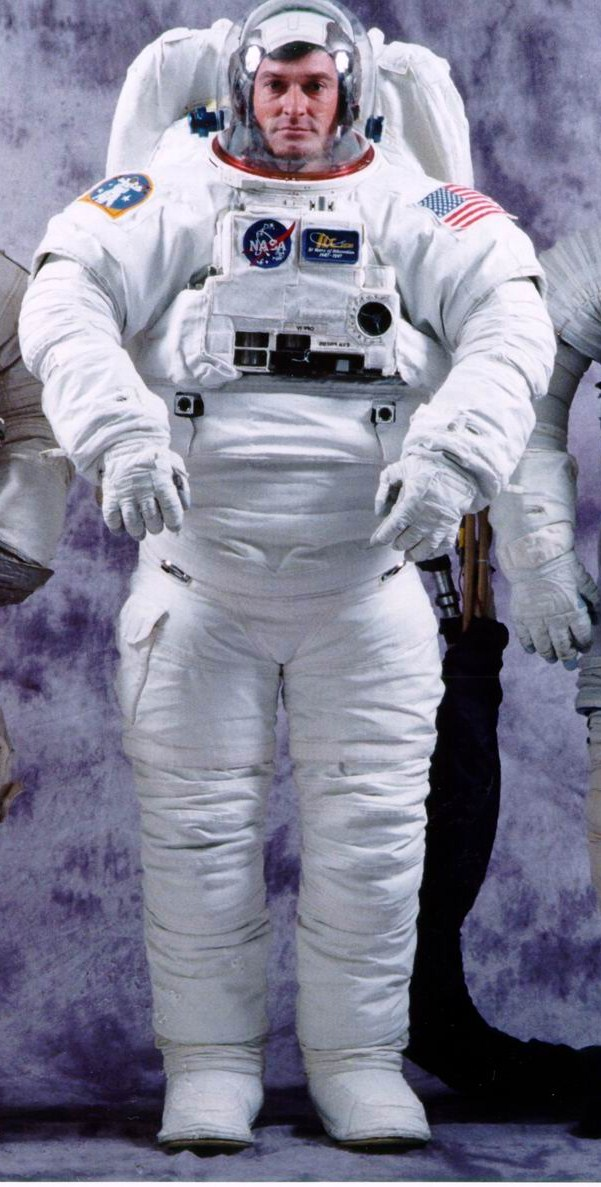
EMU without Extravehicular Visor Assembly

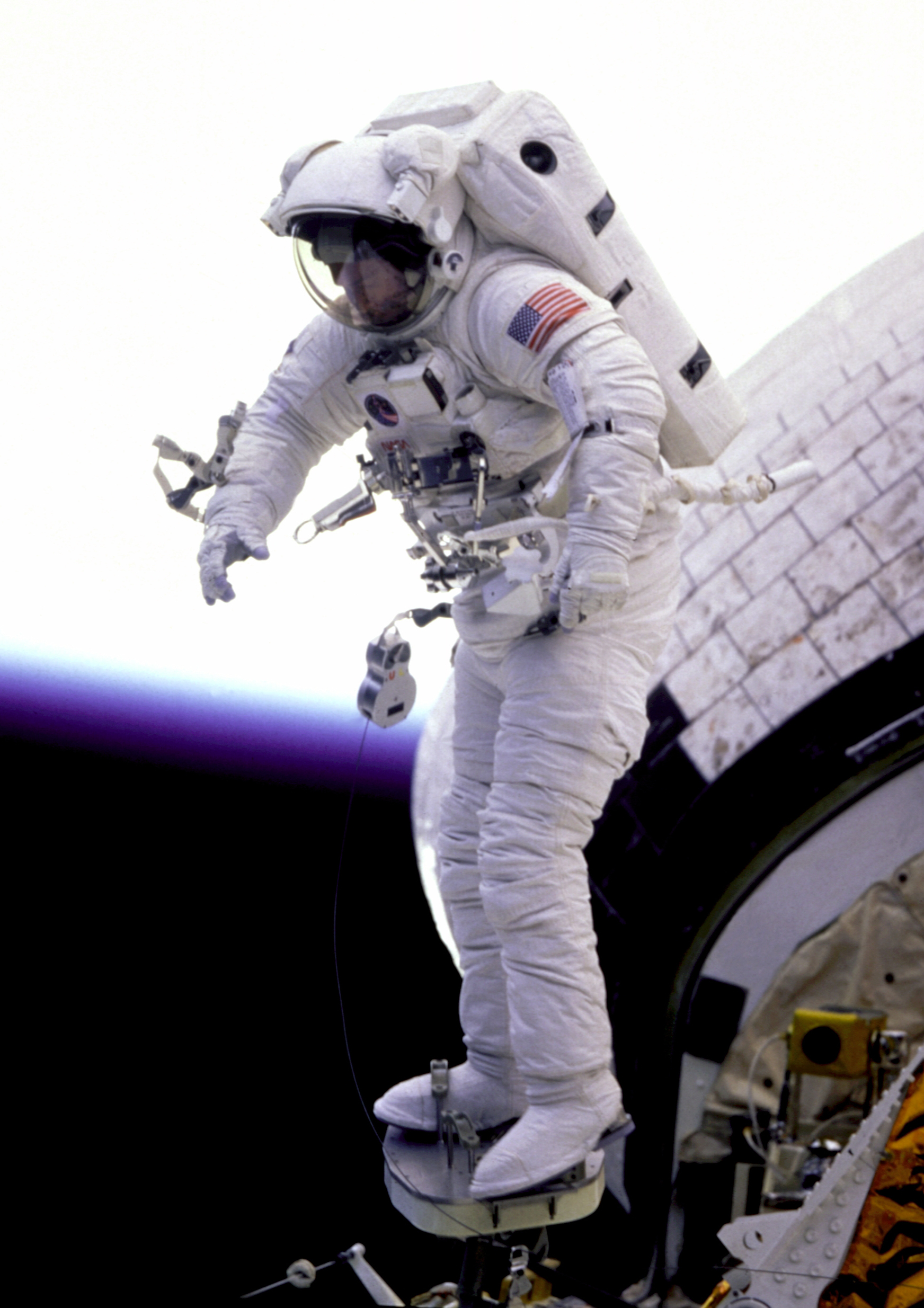
EMU without television camera and SAFER
