= Hard Upper Torso =

Space suit component

A Hard Upper Torso Assembly, or HUT, is a central component of several space suits, notably Roscosmos' Orlan and NASA's Extravehicular Mobility Unit (EMU). The fiberglass HUT forms a rigid enclosure about the upper body of the occupant, providing pressure containment for this part of the body. The HUT incorporates structural attachment points for the arms, Lower Torso Assembly (LTA), helmet, chest-mounted Display and Controls Module (DCM), and Primary Life Support Subsystem (PLSS) backpack.

The original HUT design for the EMU, first used in 1980, included bellowed shoulder bearings, which allowed for variation in the angle of the shoulder bearings. This allowed for one configuration to ease donning of the suit, and a different configuration to allow maximum mobility during EVA. However, the limited life of the bellows prompted a redesign in 1990 to a fixed shoulder bearing angle and position, referred to as the Planar HUT, resulting in reduced mobility and more difficult donning and doffing.

Because of the high cost of manufacturing, only three sizes of HUTs are produced for the EMU. This has the effect of limiting the number of people who can be properly fit for the suit. The three HUT sizes are supposed to accommodate occupants from the 5th to the 95th percentile.

The HUT also includes an In-Suit Drink Bag, with a plastic tube extending into the helmet, to allow the astronaut to stay hydrated.
