= Liquid cooling and ventilation garment =

Garment worn inside a spacesuit for cooling and ventilation

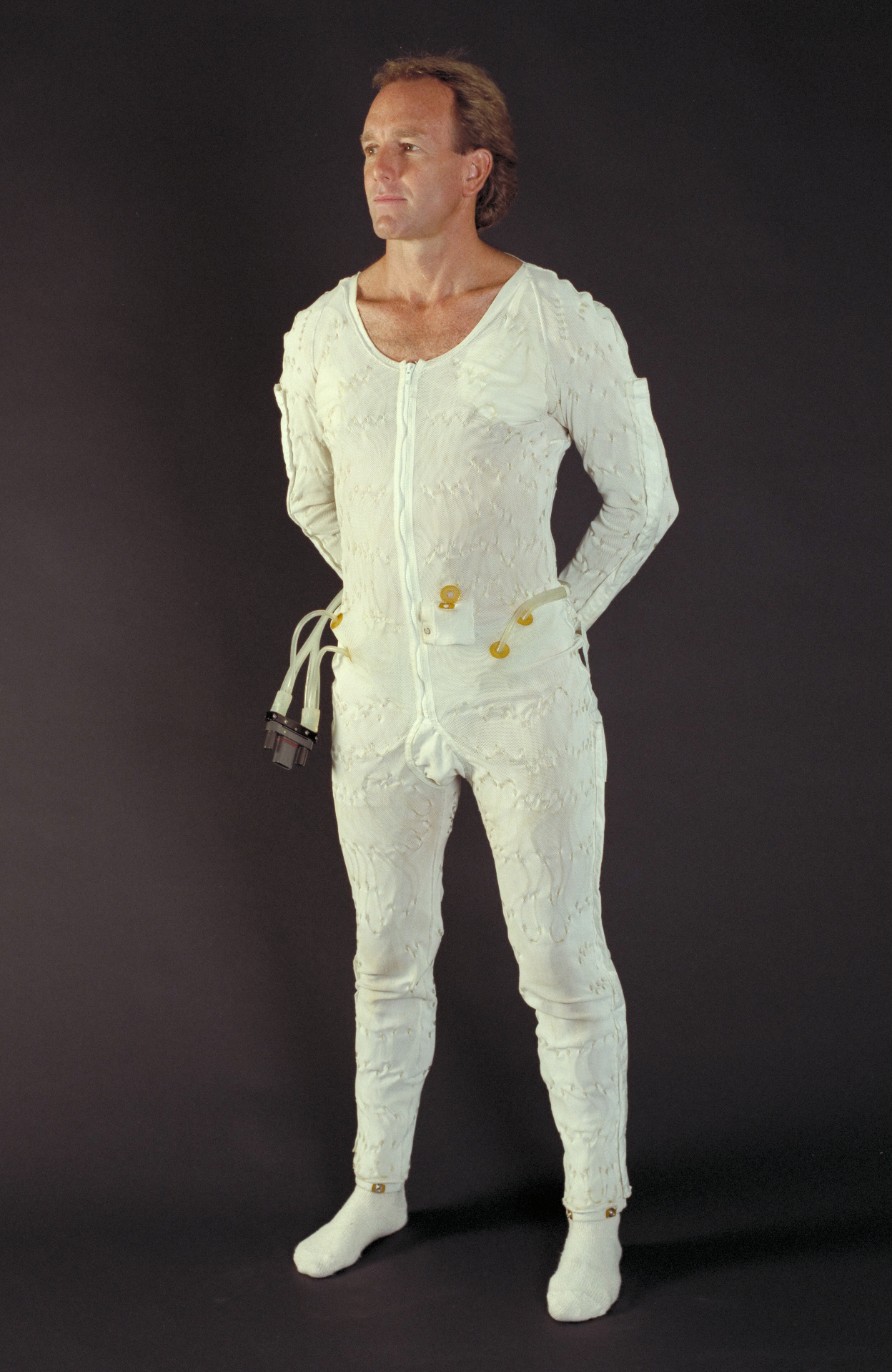
A man wearing a liquid cooling and ventilation garment for the Space Shuttle/International Space Station Extravehicular Mobility Unit (EMU)

A liquid cooling garment (LCG) is a form-fitting garment that is used to remove body heat from the wearer. It is commonly used in environments where evaporative cooling from sweating and open-air convection cooling does not work or is insufficient, or when the wearer has a biological problem that hinders self-regulation of body temperature.

A liquid cooling and ventilation garment (LCVG) has additional crush-resistant ventilation ducts, which draw moist air from the wearer's extremities, keeping the wearer dry. In a fully enclosing suit where exhaled breathing air can enter the suit, the exhaled air is moist and can lead to an uncomfortable feeling of dampness.

While this technology is most commonly associated with space suits, it is also used in a wide range of Earth-bound applications where open-air cooling is difficult or impossible to achieve, such as fire fighting, working in steel mills, and increasingly, by surgeons during long or strenuous procedures.

== Technology ==
There are typically two parts to a liquid cooling garment:

- the heat collection garment and tubing
- a heat exchanger for removal of heat from the circulated fluid

=== Garment and tubing ===
The garment is typically a close-fitting non-stretching fabric or a tight-fitting elastic fabric, with flexible tubing sewn onto the fabric. A single layer of fabric may be used, with the tubing either on the inside directly contacting the wearer's skin, or on the outside separated by the fabric. If two layers of fabric are used, stitched channels can be formed which enclose the tubing between the two fabric layers. Where flame resistance is needed, the garment may be constructed out of materials such as nomex.

The tubing is typically a few millimeters in diameter, and may be made out of any number of flexible plastics such as polyvinyl chloride (PVC) or silicone. Smaller diameter tubing permits a higher degree of garment flexibility, but at a cost of lower heat absorption capacity, and increased pressure needed to push liquid through the tubing.

When a large area needs to be cooled or the external environment also heats the tubing, a single long tube may not be enough because the liquid becomes saturated with heat and cannot cool any further. Making the liquid much colder is not an option since it leads to uncomfortable coldness where the liquid enters the tubes. Instead, multiple parallel tubes are used to increase the volume of liquid available to absorb heat.

Skin coverage and tubing density can vary depending on the application. The garment may simply be a short-sleeved shirt, or it may be a full-body suit covering the arms and legs. Where the heat removal requirement is low, the tubing may be spaced several centimeters apart across the garment surface. Where there is a very large amount of heat to remove, the tubing can be arranged in a dense grid with no gaps between the tubes.

=== Heat exchanger ===
For portable earthbound applications, the heat exchanger for cooling the liquid can be very low-tech, consisting simply of a container for holding ice, and an electric pump to circulate water from the container through the tubing. The return water is cooled by the melting ice and again pumped through the tubes. Regulation of flow is done by varying pump speed or using an adjustable flow valve. Ice storage can be achieved using a belt-pack, a backpack, or a duffel bag, depending on the length of time needed for the cooling system to operate between refilling the ice storage.

In situations where the wearer must stay in place inside a vehicle, heavy but long-term-operation heat exchangers can be used, such as a refrigeration system to cool the liquid.

When the user's movement is partially hindered through the use of a life-support umbilical, cooling liquid can also be supplied via the umbilical.

== Space applications ==
Astronauts commonly wear a liquid cooling and ventilation garment in order to maintain a comfortable core body temperature during extra-vehicular activity (EVA). The LCVG accomplishes this task by circulating cool water through a network of flexible tubes in direct contact with the astronaut's skin. The water draws heat away from the body, resulting in a lower core temperature. The water then returns to the primary life support system (PLSS), where it is cooled in a heat exchanger before being recirculated.

In an independent space suit, the heat is ultimately transferred to a thin sheet of ice (formed by a separate feed water source). Due to the extremely low pressure in space, the heated ice sublimates directly to water vapor, which is then vented away from the suit.

The ice sublimator consists of sintered nickel plates with microscopic pores which are sized to permit the water to freeze in the plate without damaging it. When heat needs to be removed, the ice in the pores melts and the water passes through them to form a thin sheet which sublimates. When there is no need for heat to be removed, this water refreezes, sealing the plate. The rate of sublimation of the ice is directly proportional to the amount of heat needing to be removed, so the system is self-regulating and needs no moving parts. During EVA on the Moon, this system had an outlet gas temperature of 44 °F (7 °C), As an example, during the Apollo 12 commander's first EVA (of 3 hrs, 44 minutes), 4.75 lb (2.15 kg) of feedwater were sublimated, and this dissipated 894.4 BTU/h (262.1 W). The pores eventually get clogged through contamination and the plates need to be replaced.

In a dependent space suit (such as the ones used in the Gemini program or within lunar orbit on the Apollo program), the heat is carried back to a host spacecraft through an umbilical connection, where it is ultimately radiated or sublimated via the spacecraft's own thermal control system.

Because the space environment is essentially a vacuum, heat cannot be lost through heat convection, and can only be directly dissipated through thermal radiation, a much slower process. Thus, even though the environment of space can be extremely cold, excessive heat build-up is inevitable. Without an LCVG, there would be no means by which to expel this heat, and it would affect not only EVA performance, but the health of the suit occupant as well. The LCVG used with the Apollo/Skylab A7L suit could remove heat at a rate of approximately 2,000 BTU/h (590 W)

The LCVG used with NASA's Extravehicular Mobility Unit is primarily constructed of spandex, with a nylon tricot liner. The tubes are made of polyvinyl chloride.

== Other applications ==
LCVGs, while initially developed for space exploration, have been adapted for an array of applications on Earth. These garments, vital for temperature regulation in environments where traditional cooling is ineffective, have been utilized in the military, sports, and various medical fields.

Originally designed for astronauts and pilots, LCVGs were later adapted for military applications, including for helicopter pilots and mine rescue workers. In the 1980s, their use expanded to include recreational and industrial settings.

In the medical sphere, LCVGs have been used for conditions like hypohidrotic ectodermal dysplasia, where patients are unable to sweat and regulate body temperature. These garments have also been effective in treating multiple sclerosis, peripheral neuropathy, epidermolysis bullosa, spina bifida, and cerebral palsy, by providing controlled cooling to the body.

LCVGs have found use in sports therapy. Devices applying pressure and cold to injured areas have been beneficial for both human athletes and animals like dogs and horses. Cooling systems are also used to enhance performance and reduce the risk of concussions in athletes.

LCVGs have been employed in industrial settings to aid workers who wear heavy protective clothing or work in hot environments. This includes applications in hazardous material cleanup, power plant operations, and mining.

== Gallery ==
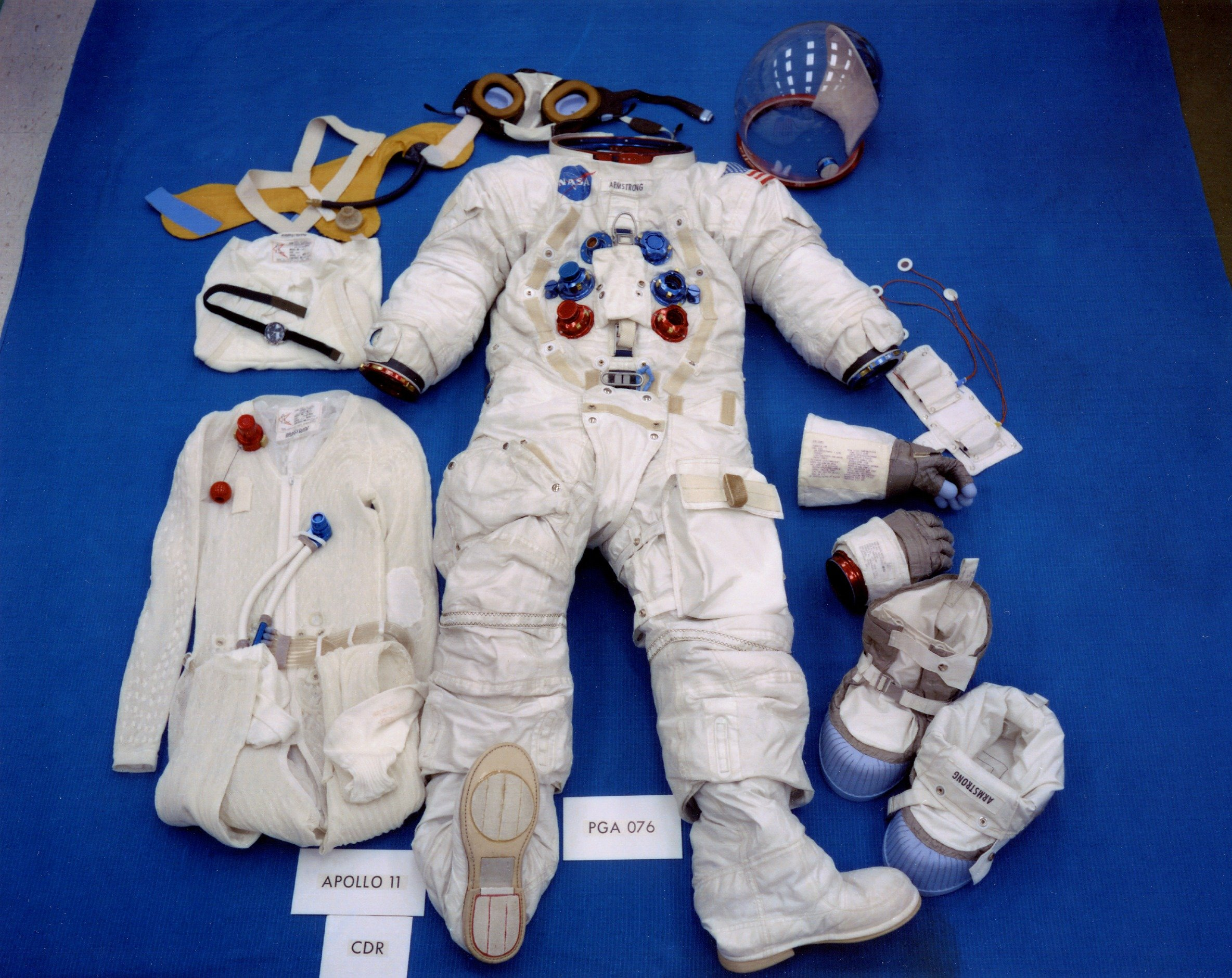
Apollo/Skylab A7L with LCVG

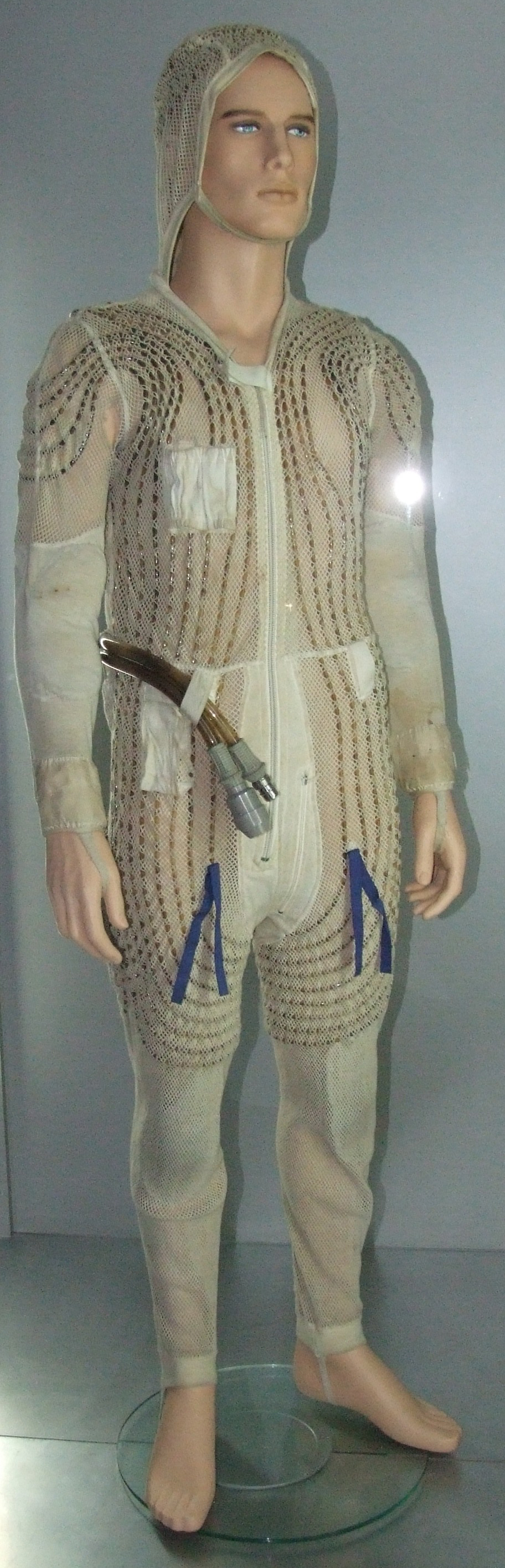
Old Orlan LCVG

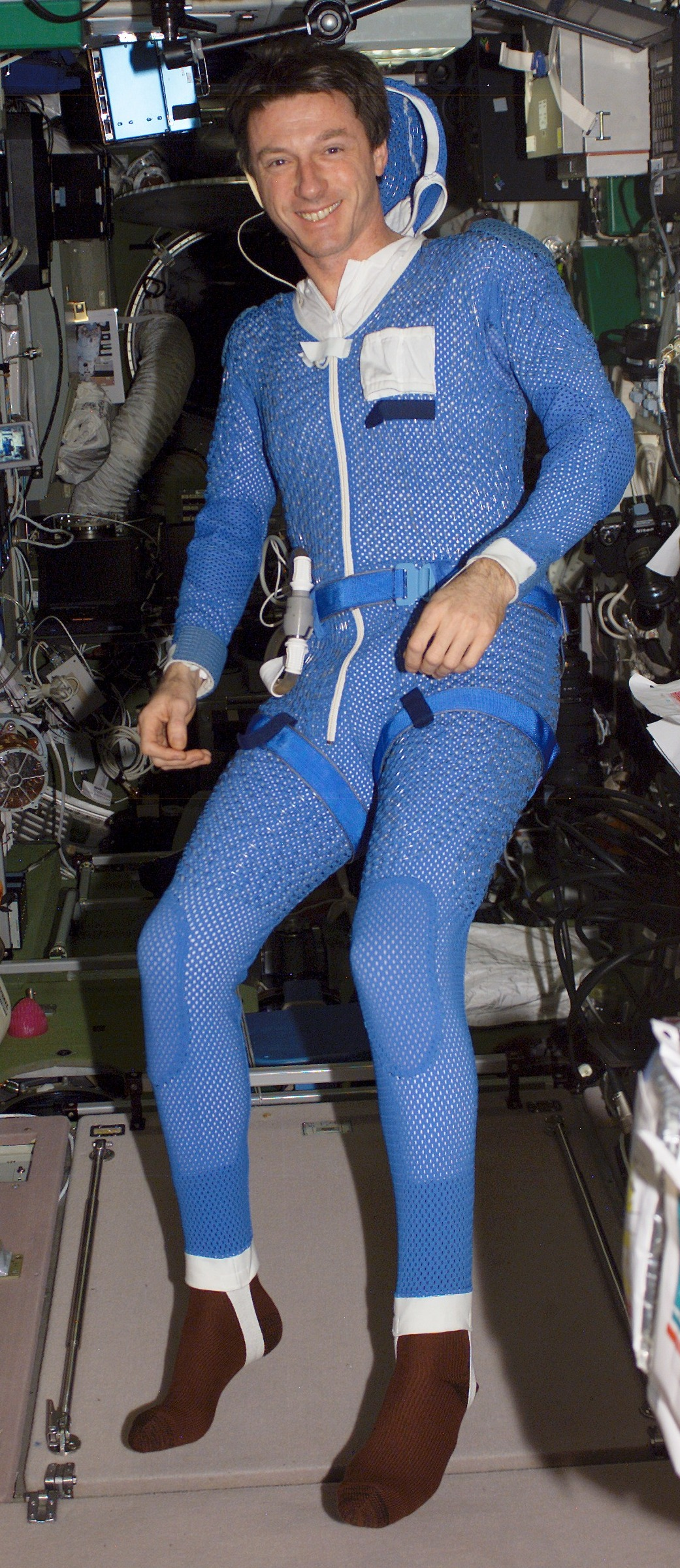
Current Orlan LCVG
