= Eleanor Foraker =

American seamstress (1930–2011)

Eleanor Foraker (September 2, 1930 – December 8, 2011) was an American seamstress who worked at the International Latex Corporation (ILC) and at NASA. She left the Playtex division of ILC Dover in 1964 and then worked on underground inflatable oil tanks and gas masks to aid the development of the A7L spacesuit for the Apollo 11 mission. She also stitched together the airbag system that was used to land the Sojourner rover on Mars for the Pathfinder Mission.

== Early career ==
Foraker was born on September 2, 1930, in Kenton, Delaware. She worked at ILC Dover for 43 years as a seamstress and later manager on cloth diaper covers sewing projects. After ILC was contracted by NASA in 1964, she worked on sewing Apollo-mission spacesuits. From 1968 to 1974, she continued as a supervisor and manager at ILC.

== Apollo mission ==
For the Apollo missions, one of Foraker's tasks in her supervising role was managing the use of sewing pins by the ILC Dover seamstresses. Each seamstress was given a set of pins with different colored heads so that Foraker could track who worked on each suit and prevent pin pokes to the suits' behinds.

Foraker also taught, along with other seamstresses that worked in the ILC's Playtex division, NASA engineers how to sew and suggested improvements to the spacesuits.

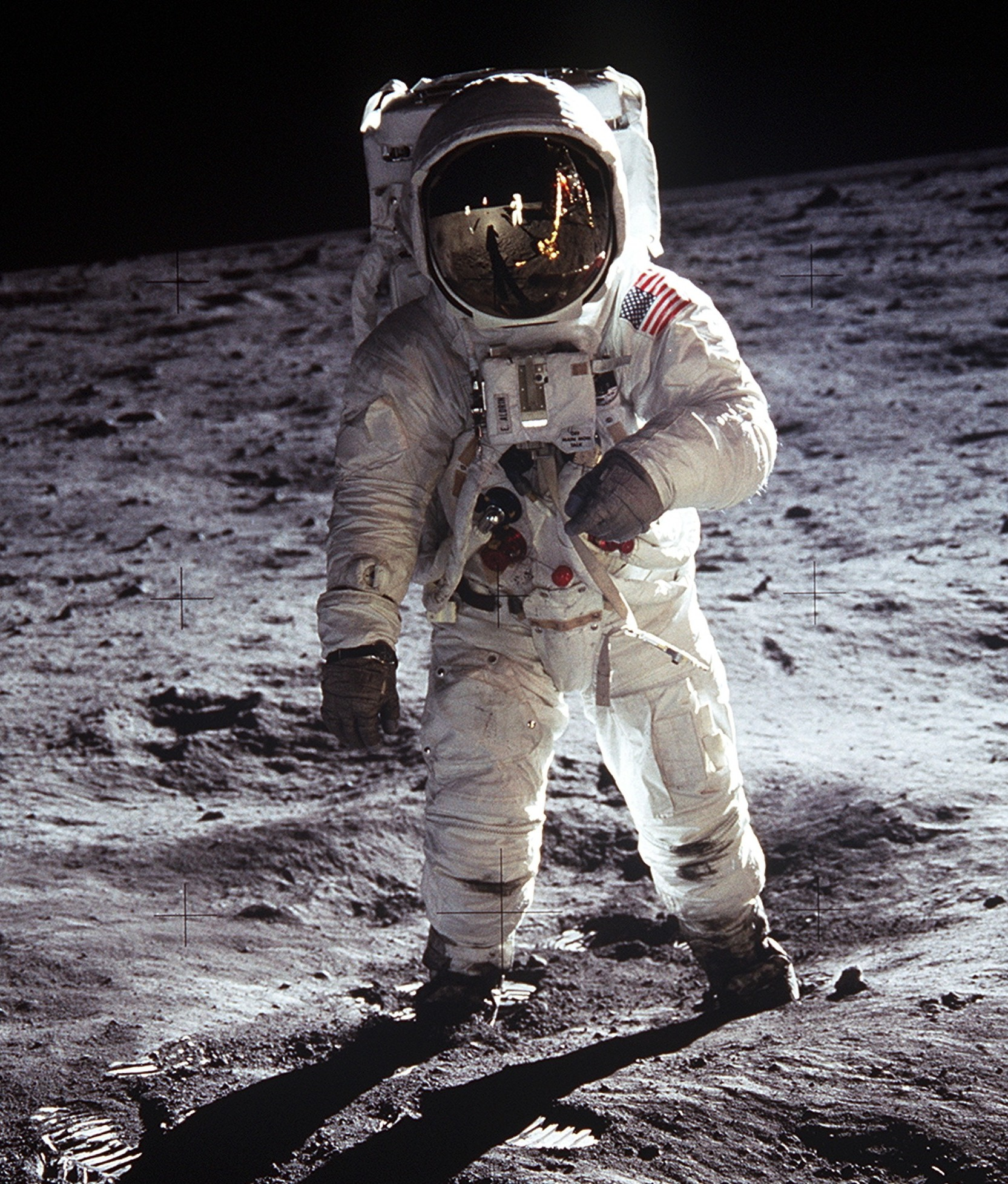
Buzz Aldrin wearing the A7L spacesuit

Foraker had no days off or vacations for three years and ended up suffering two nervous breakdowns during this time.

== Legacy ==
Nicholas de Monchaux's book, Spacesuit: Fashioning Apollo, published in 2011, details the making of the A7L spacesuit and acknowledges the seamstresses' role in its creation. While no movie has yet been released, in 2013 Warner Bros. hired Richard Cordiner to write a script for film adaptation of Spacesuit. Inspired by the real events of Foraker's life, a children's book entitled The Spacesuit: How a Seamstress Helped Put a Man on the Moon, was published in 2019 which loosely follows her story working on the A7L spacesuit.
