= Thermal Micrometeoroid Garment =

Outer, protective layer of a spacesuit

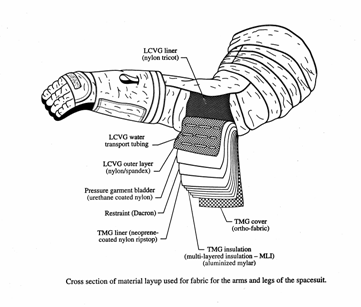
Cross-section of layers in space suit construction

An (Integrated) Thermal Micrometeoroid Garment (TMG or ITMG) is the outer layer of a space suit. The TMG has three functions: to insulate the suit occupant and prevent heat loss, to shield the occupant from harmful solar radiation, and to protect the astronaut from micrometeoroids and other orbital debris, which could puncture the suit and depressurize it. (This latter function is provided for spacecraft by Micrometeoroid and Orbital Debris (MMOD) Protection systems.)

The specific design of TMGs varies between different space agencies and different suits, though they all serve the same purpose.

== A7L suit (Apollo/Skylab) ==
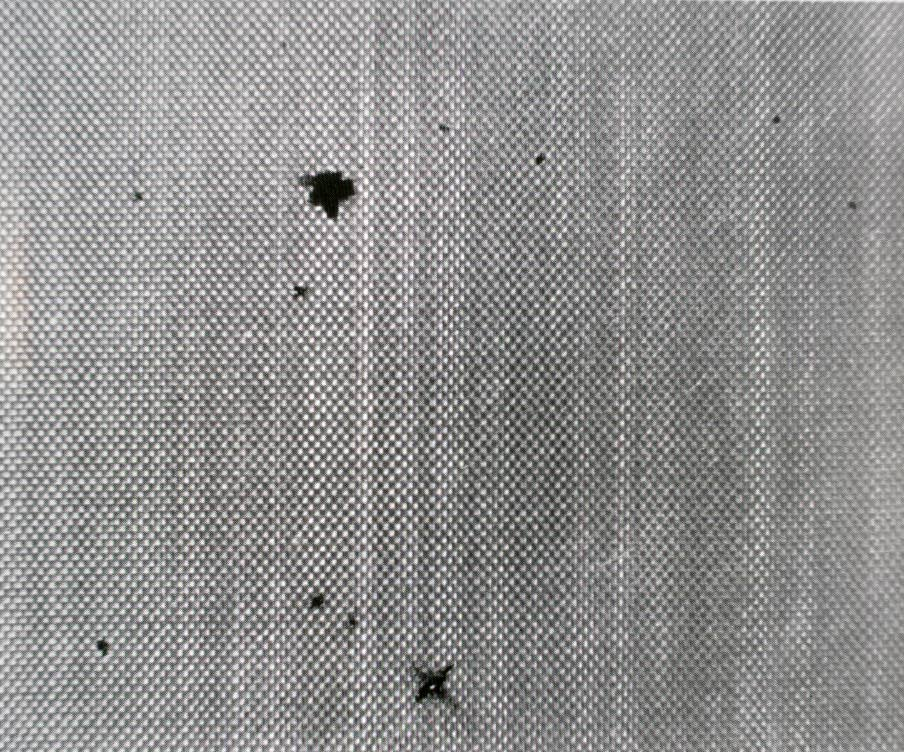
Micrometeoroid impacts in Beta cloth

Outside a Liquid Cooling and Ventilation Garment, pressure bladder, and restraint layer, the TMG for the A7L suit worn on the Moon and during the Skylab Program began with a layer of neoprene-coated nylon ripstop. This was the innermost layer of protection from micrometeoroids. Next, thermal radiation protection was provided by five layers of aluminized PET film (Mylar), alternating with four layers of nonwoven Dacron, which provided thermal spacing, followed by two layers of aluminized polyimide Kapton film and Beta cloth marquisette laminate. The outermost layer of PTFE (Teflon)-coated filament Beta cloth was non-flammable and provided abrasion protection from the notoriously abrasive lunar dust. This layer was supplemented with Teflon abrasion patches at the knees and other areas.

== EMU suit (Space Shuttle/ISS) ==
The construction of the TMG on the EMU suits in use on the Space Shuttle and International Space Station differs somewhat from the construction of the Apollo/Skylab TMG.

The EMU TMG includes seven layers of aluminized Mylar laminated with Dacron, rather than five, and eliminates the use of Kapton. The outermost layer is white Ortho-Fabric, made with a blend of Gore-Tex, Kevlar, and Nomex. This layer can withstand temperatures from −300 to 300 °F (−180 to 150 °C). The outer layer provides both micrometeoroid and thermal protection, by reflecting most of the sun's thermal radiation.
