= Joanne Thompson (seamstress) =

External videos
- <iframe width='560' height='315' src='https://www.youtube.com/embed/zGyT_bV0RSA?si=zURoGGlaAgY1AKr9' title='YouTube video player' frameborder='0' allow='accelerometer; autoplay; clipboard-write; encrypted-media; gyroscope; picture-in-picture; web-share' referrerpolicy='strict-origin-when-cross-origin' allowfullscreen=''></iframe>

Joanne Thompson (born 1938) is an American seamstress who helped develop and fabricate space suits for the Apollo program as part of the team of ILC Dover seamstress. She specialized in fabricating the gloves that were worn by the astronauts on the Apollo 11 moon landing mission. The glove designs she helped develop influenced subsequent generations of space equipment. Her career spans a significant period in American aerospace history, from the Apollo program through multiple subsequent NASA initiatives.

== Career ==
Thompson began her career as a dressmaker. She joined International Latex Corporation (ILC) Dover in the 1960s after completing the company's required sewing proficiency tests. There she contributed to the development and production of NASA spacesuits during the Apollo program.

Thompson was part of the technical team at ILC Dover that produced spacesuits for NASA's Apollo program. She specialized in fabricating astronaut gloves, working with custom molds created from each astronaut's hands. The production process required extensive quality control measures. These measures included the creation of multiple seam samples that underwent destructive testing to ensure the integrity of the final products. Her work contributed to the successful completion of multiple Apollo missions, including Apollo 11, where her gloves were worn by astronauts Neil Armstrong and Buzz Aldrin during the first moon landing.

Thompson's work at ILC Dover represented a significant intersection between traditional garment-making skills and aerospace technology. The company, primarily known for producing Playtex women's undergarments, leveraged its expertise in flexible materials and precision sewing to secure the NASA spacesuit contract. The spacesuit designs incorporated materials similar to those used in undergarment construction. The techniques developed during this era continue to influence modern spacesuit design, with similar principles still being applied to suits used on the International Space Station.

Thompson maintained her position at ILC Dover for 38 years, continuing to work on spacesuit development well beyond the Apollo program. Her techniques and expertise contributed to later space programs, including equipment used on Skylab and subsequent NASA missions.
