= Beta cloth =

Fireproof textile

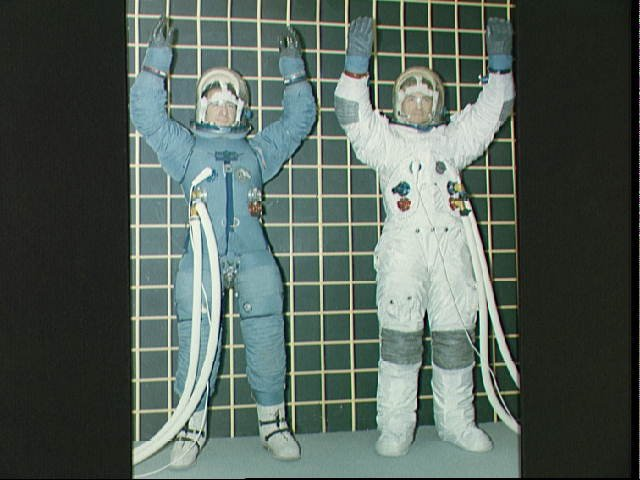
Apollo pressure suit before (left), and after the addition of Beta cloth (right)

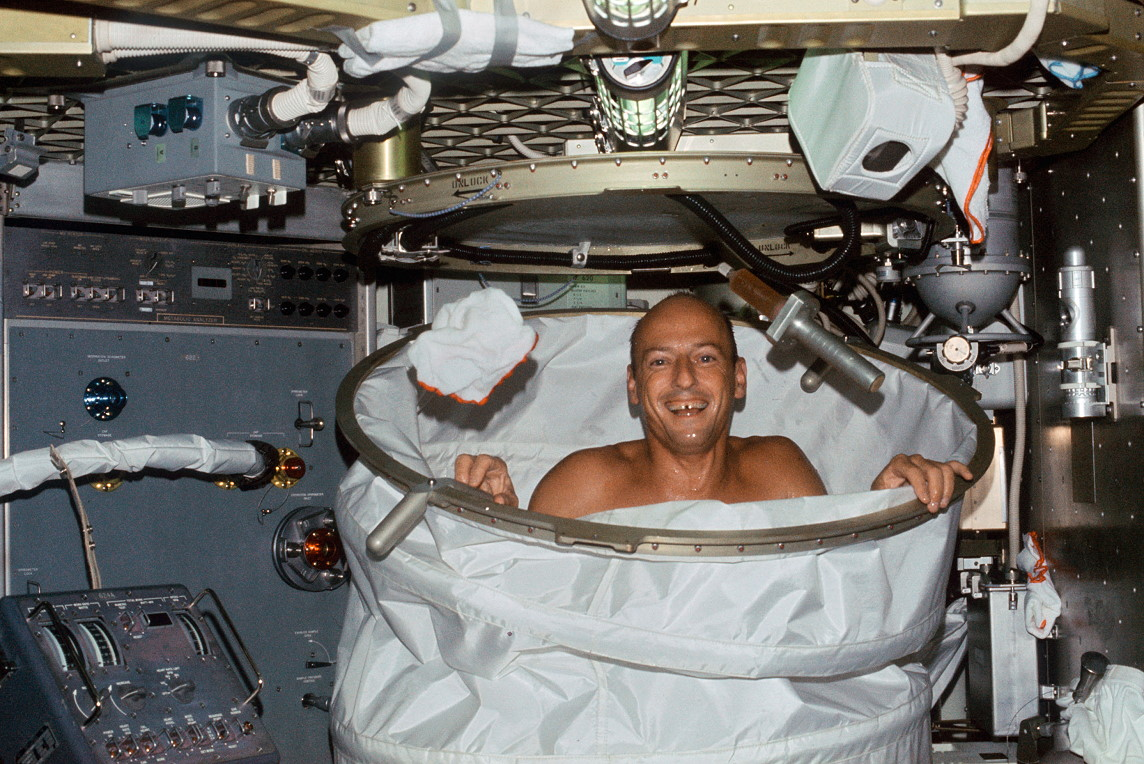
Pete Conrad in the Skylab shower in 1973 behind the Skylab shower enclosure which was made of Beta cloth stretched between rings.

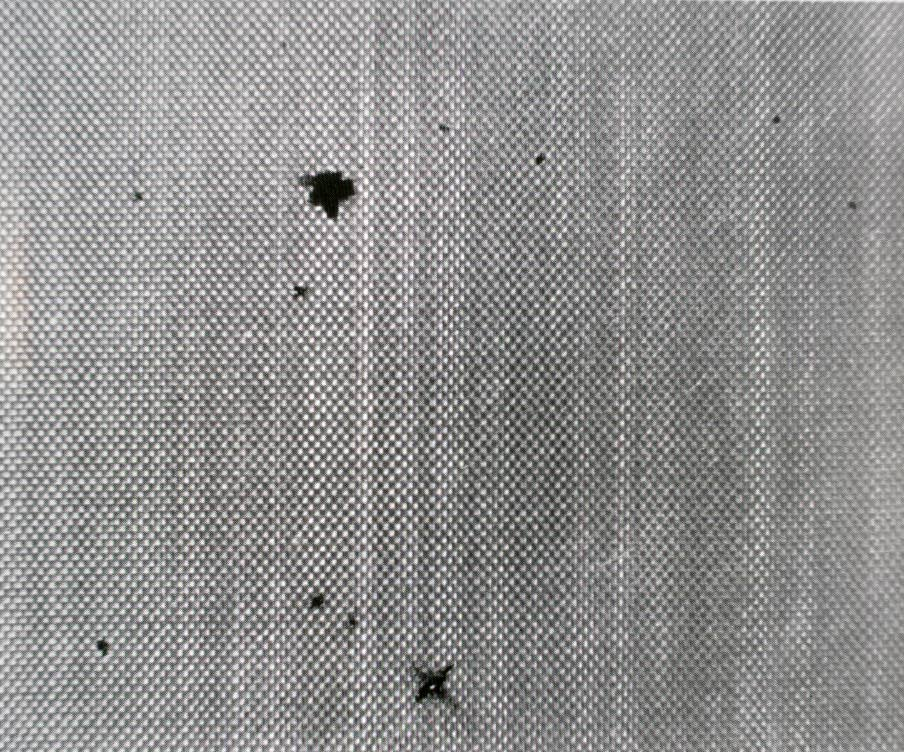
Micrometeoroid impacts in Beta cloth

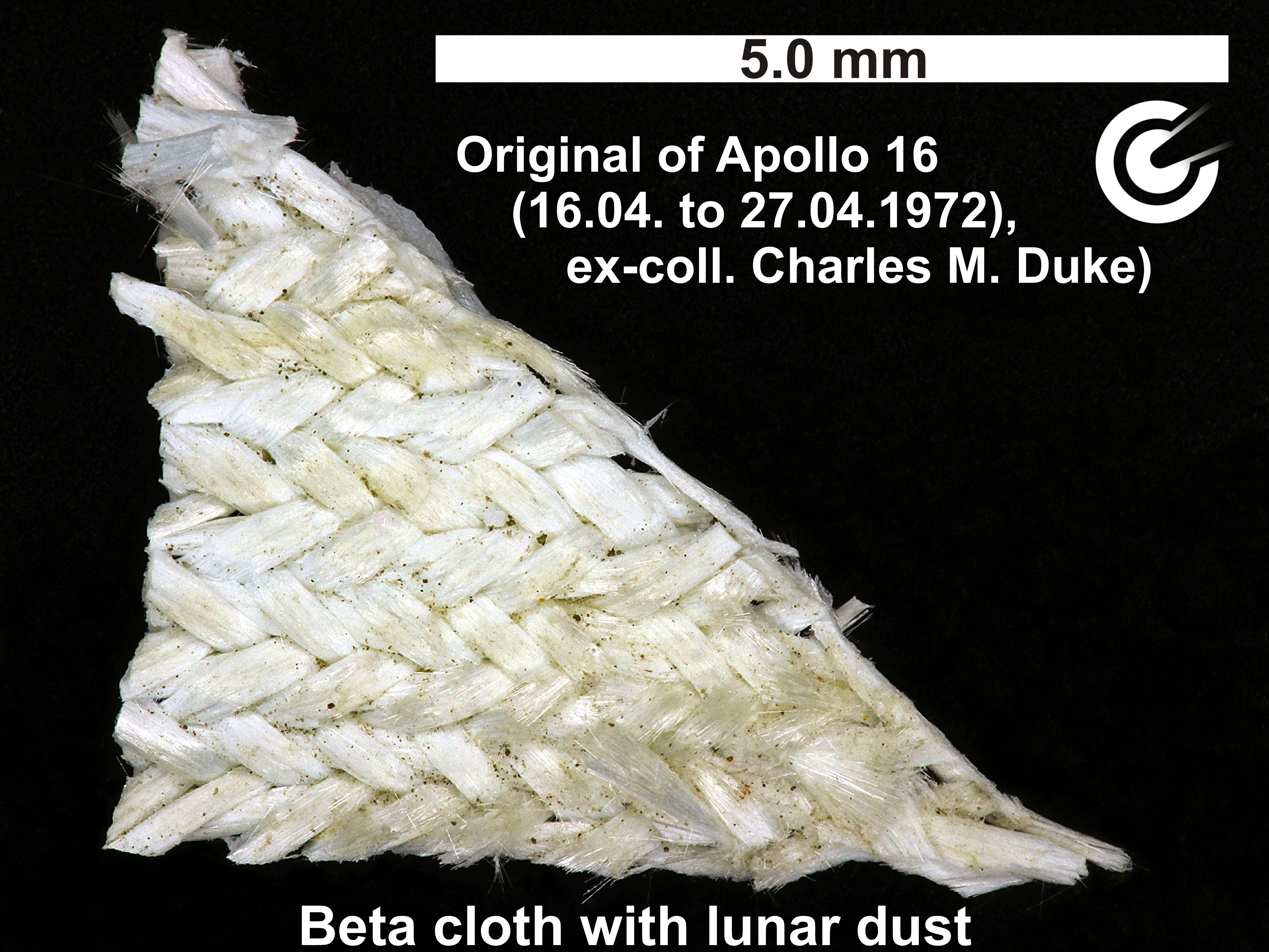
Beta cloth with lunar dust

Beta cloth is a type of fireproof PTFE impregnated silica fiber cloth used in the manufacture of Apollo/Skylab A7L space suits, the Apollo Thermal Micrometeoroid Garment, the McDivitt Purse, and in other specialized applications.

Beta cloth consists of fine woven silica fiber, similar to glass fiber. The resulting fabric does not burn, and melts only at temperatures exceeding 650 °C (1,200 °F). To reduce its tendency to crease or tear when manipulated, and to increase durability, the fibers are coated with Teflon.

== Details ==
The tight weave of Beta cloth makes it more resistant to atomic oxygen exposure. Its ability to resist atomic oxygen exposure means it is commonly used as the outer-most layer of multi-layer insulation for space; it was used on the Space Shuttle and the International Space Station.

It was incorporated into NASA space suits after the deadly 1967 Apollo 1 launch pad fire, in which the astronauts' nylon suits burned through. After the fire, the Apollo 204 Review Board that was assigned to investigate the accident recommended that any potentially combustible materials be removed and replaced by non-flammable materials from both the spacecraft and space suits. Beta cloth was developed by a Manned Spacecraft Center team led by Frederick S. Dawn and including Matthew I. Radnofsky working with the Owens-Corning and DuPont companies.

Where additional wear resistance was needed, external patches of Chromel-R metallic cloth were used.

Beta cloth was used as the material for the Skylab shower enclosure.

The interior of the Space Shuttle payload bay was almost completely covered with Beta cloth. This protected it while it was opened for weeks at a time in space.

Beta cloth is used on the Curiosity Mars rover.

== See also ==
- Multi-layer insulation – Thermal insulation using several thin layers
- Materials for use in vacuum
