= Iona Allen =

Co-creator of NASA space suits

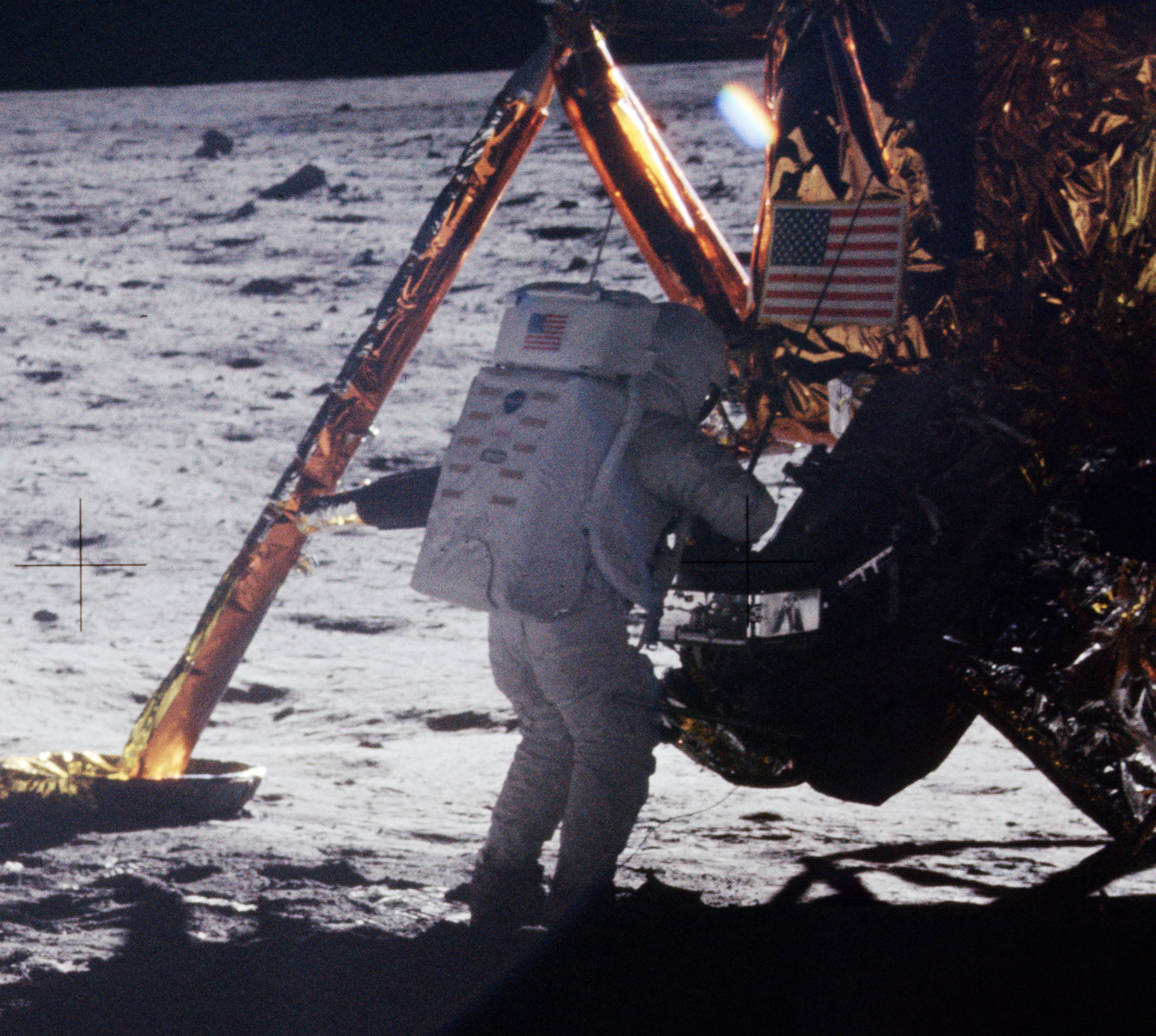
Neil Armstrong wearing the boots created by Iona Allen

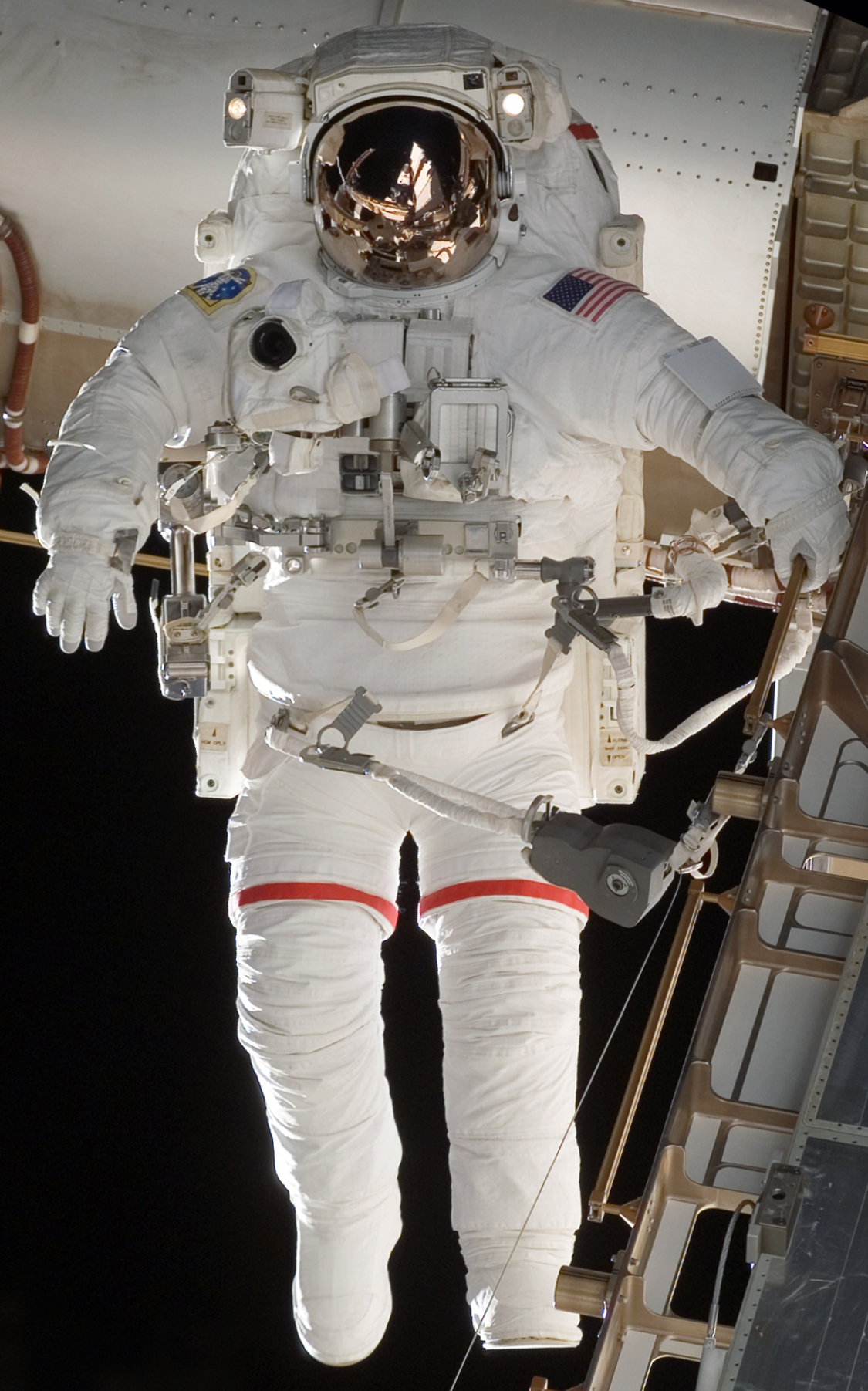
An Extravehicular Mobility Unit suit of the kind Iona Allen helped create

Iona Tolliver Allen (May 17, 1937 – July 15, 2003) was an American seamstress who helped develop and create space suits for multiple NASA space missions as part of the ILC Dover seamstresses team. She constructed the boots that Neil Armstrong wore when he first walked on the Moon, and also worked on later Extravehicular Mobility Unit suits for astronauts in the Space Shuttle program.

== Career ==
Allen worked at International Latex Corporation (ILC) as part of the ILC Dover seamstresses team. ILC had contracts with NASA to construct space suits for the Apollo program and the Space Shuttle program. Allen worked on both of these initiatives. The ILC Dover seamstress team, including Allen, had ongoing input into the design on the astronauts' suits.

Allen personally constructed the boots that Neil Armstrong wore when he first walked on the Moon. Construction of Armstrong's boots took weeks. They consisted of thirteen layers, each of which had to be sewn perfectly and pass inspection. The boots, as well as the Apollo A7L and A7LB spacesuits created by Allen's team, suffered no major mishaps the entire time they were in use. An ILC space suit designer at the time said of Allen: "She was the only one to ever make a perfect pair of boots."

Allen was one of the several Black women who worked on this integrated team. She worked for ILC for twenty-nine years. She retired in 1998, though she later went to work for Draperies Etc.

== Personal life ==
Allen was born in Virginia in 1937 with the birth (maiden) name of Iona Tolliver. She had three sisters and two brothers. She married Sam Allen and had one child. She joined the NAACP and was a Jehovah's Witness. She died at the age of 66, on July 15, 2003.
