= Jeanne Wilson (seamstress) =

American spacesuit seamstress

Jeanne Wilson, also known as Jean Esther Wilson, was among the group of seamstresses who sewed the spacesuits worn by Neil Armstrong and Buzz Aldrin during the Apollo 11 moon landing. These seamstresses were employed by ILC Dover (International Latex Corporation). Wilson had responsibility for sewing the suit's torso, arms, legs, and name badges, with other seamstresses assigned to sew other sections of the suit. In a 2022 Threads magazine article, Wilson describes the process of working with the engineers and the importance of seamstresses' feedback during the creation of the spacesuit.

Wilson was the tenth of thirteen children and was taught to sew by her mother at age 7. She was designing and sewing doll clothes by age 9. In 1969, at age 19, Wilson left a job sewing suitcases to pursue the opportunity to work on the Apollo spacesuits.
