= ILC Dover seamstresses =

Group employed in construction of the Apollo program space suits

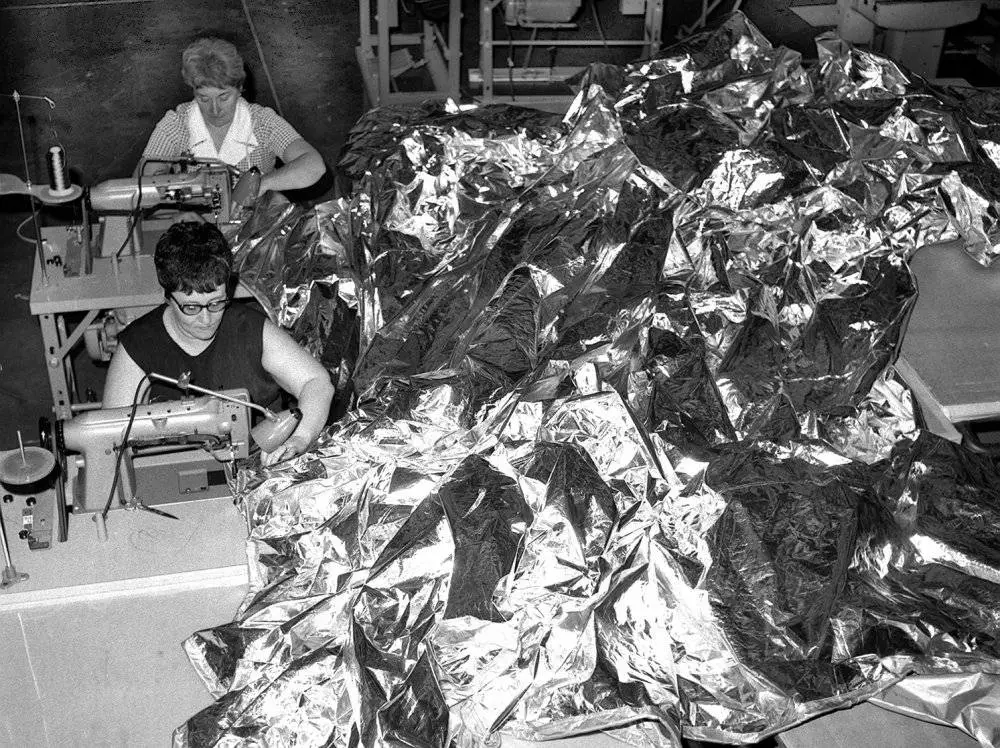
Delores Zeroles (front) and Ceal Webb of ILC Dover stitching together a sun-shield for Skylab.

The ILC Dover seamstresses were a group of women who worked for the International Latex Corporation (now ILC Dover). The seamstresses played a key role in the construction of the space suits for the Apollo program. Employed as skilled garment workers, these women were responsible for sewing along with executing the complex cutting, glueing, molding, and latex processes that went into the construction of the Apollo space suit.

Some of the women had been recruited from the Playtex division of ILC, while other came from nearby clothing and luggage manufacturers. Many had learned the sewing trade from their mothers or in high school home economics classes. However to succeed at ILC, the women had to be willing to learn new sewing techniques, perform their tasks at a slow pace, work with novel textiles, and perform to exacting standards.

The space suits functioned as individual, personalized space crafts designed to keep a human alive in the environment of space or the lunar surface. The production line at ILC followed NASA-mandated engineering guidelines that were significantly stricter than typical clothing manufacturing processes. Tolerance for variation in the stitches were less than 1/64 of an inch from the seam.

== Women known to have worked on the Apollo space suits ==
- Iona Allen
- Delema Austin
- Julia Avery
- Doris Boisey
- Velma (or Thelma) Breeding
- Julia Brown
- Francine (Fran) Burris
- Jane Butchin
- Ethel Collins
- Delema Comegys
- Henrietta Crawford
- Lillie Elliott
- Ruth Embert
- Evelyn Everett
- Hazel Fellows
- Eleanor Foraker
- Madeline Ivory
- Evelyn Kibler
- Beverly Killen
- Anna Lee Minner
- Roberta Pilkenton
- Ruth Anna Ratledge
- Sue Roberts
- Gail Smith
- Arlene Thalen
- Joanne Thompson
- Mary Todd
- Michelle Trice
- Ceil Webb
- Jeanne Wilson (also known as Jean)
- Clyde Wosylkowski
- Delores Zeroles

== Collections ==
"ILC Industries NASA Spacesuit Project Oral Histories (collection)." Hagley Digital Archives. See interviews with Roberta Pilkenton, Gail Smith, Eleanor Foraker, and Iona Allen.

Smithsonian National Air and Space Museum, Archives Division. See photographs of women working on the Apollo A7L spacesuit at the International Latex Corporation (ILC) Federica (Dover), Delaware that were released in 1968.

== Additional sources ==
- "Apollo Space Suit: A Historic Mechanical Engineering Landmark." American Society of Mechanical Engineers. September 20, 2013.
- Chaikin, Andrew. "Neil Armstrong's Spacesuit Was Made by a Bra Manufacturer." Smithsonian Magazine, updated March 11, 2020.
- Chua, Jasmin Malik. "The Girdle-Inspired History of the Very First Spacesuits." Racked.com, September 5, 2018.
- "Dr. Emily A. Margolis Recognizes Women in STEM." Smithsonian American Women's History Museum. May 10, 2021.
- Goff-Dupont, Sarah. "Stitches In Space: The Astronaut's Clothes." Atlassian.com, July 20, 2020.
- "Space Suits, Mission Critical." Fit 2 Stitch, Season 10, Episode 1012. American Public Television, originally aired January 3, 2022.
- NASA. Moon Spacewear (video). 1971. National Archives and Records Administration, Records of the National Aeronautics and Space Administration, NAID 4148157.
- Nelson, Sue. "The Women Who Sewed the Suits for the Space Race." BBC.com, December 19, 2019.
- Peabody, Lizzie, host. "Outer Space & Underwear." Sidedoor: A Smithsonian Podcast. March 4, 2020.
- "The Seamstresses Who Fashioned Apollo's Spacesuits." CBS Morning News. July 14, 2019.
- Way, Elizabeth. "Designing Spacesuits" in Expedition: Fashion from the Extreme. Fashion Institute of Technology, November 15, 2017.
