= Nomex =

Flame-resistant meta-aramid material

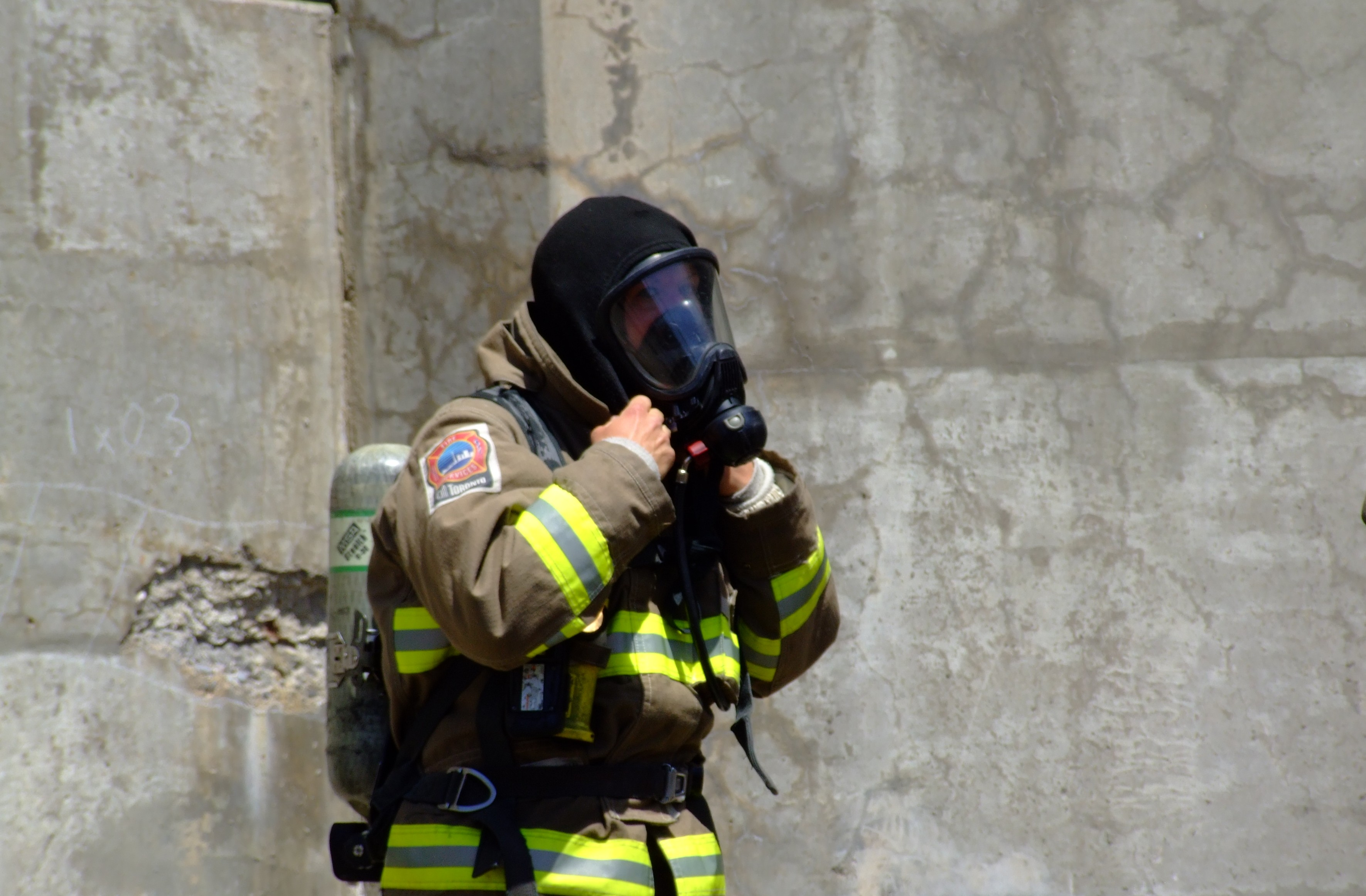
A firefighter in Toronto, Canada wears a Nomex hood in 2007.

Nomex is a trademarked term for an inherently flame-resistant fabric with meta-aramid chemistry widely used for industrial applications and fire protection equipment. It was developed in the early 1960s by DuPont and first marketed in 1967.

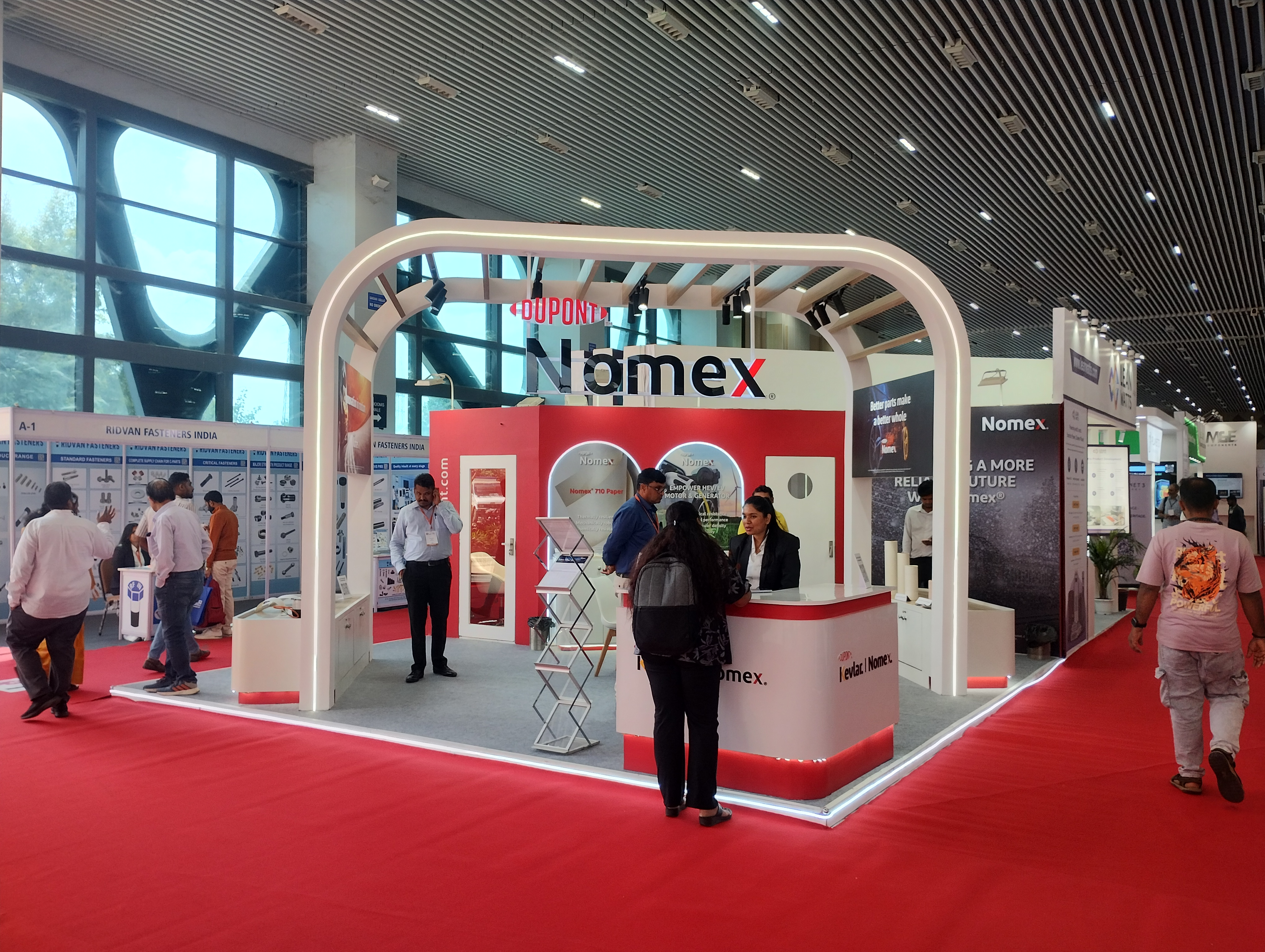
DuPont Nomex at Auto EV Bharat 4.0, KTPO Exhibition and Convention Centre, Bangalore (2025)

Kevlar is often added to Nomex to increase its resistance to breakage or tear.

== Properties ==
Nomex and related aramid polymers are related to nylon, but have aromatic backbones, and hence are more rigid and more durable. Nomex is an example of a meta variant of the aramids (Kevlar is a para aramid). Unlike Kevlar, Nomex strands cannot align during filament polymerization and have less strength: its ultimate tensile strength is 340 MPa (49,000 psi). However, it has excellent thermal, chemical, and radiation resistance for a polymer material. It can withstand temperatures of up to 370 °C (700 °F).

== Production ==
Nomex is produced by condensation reaction from the monomers m-phenylenediamine and isophthaloyl chloride.

It is sold in both fiber and sheet forms and is used as a fabric where resistance from heat and flame is required. Nomex sheet is actually a calendered paper and made in a similar fashion. Nomex Type 410 paper was the first Nomex paper developed and one of the higher volume grades made, mostly for electrical insulation purposes.

Wilfred Sweeny (1926–2011), the DuPont scientist responsible for discoveries leading to Nomex, earned a DuPont Lavoisier Medal in 2002 partly for this work.

== Applications ==
Nomex Paper is used in electrical laminates such as circuit boards and transformer cores as well as fireproof honeycomb structures where it is saturated with a phenolic resin. Honeycomb structures such as these, as well as mylar-Nomex laminates, are used extensively in aircraft construction. Firefighting, military aviation, and vehicle racing industries use Nomex to create clothing and equipment that can withstand intense heat.

A Nomex hood is a common piece of racing and firefighting equipment. It is placed on the head on top of a firefighter's face mask. The hood protects the portions of the head not covered by the helmet and face mask from the intense heat of the fire.

Wildland firefighters wear Nomex shirts and trousers as part of their personal protective equipment during wildfire suppression activities.

Racing car drivers wear driving suits constructed of Nomex and or other fire retardant materials, along with Nomex gloves, long underwear, balaclavas, socks, helmet lining and shoes, to protect them in the event of a fire.

Military pilots and aircrew wear flight suits made of over 92 percent Nomex to protect them from cockpit fires (previously issued flight suits were treated in borax solution prior to the introduction). It is also worn as sailors' anti-flash gear. Troops riding in ground vehicles often wear Nomex for fire protection. Kevlar thread is often used to hold the fabric together at seams.

Military tank crews also typically use Nomex uniforms as protection against fire.

In the U.S. space program, Nomex has been used for the Thermal Micrometeoroid Garment on the Extravehicular Mobility Unit (in conjunction with Kevlar and Gore-Tex) and ACES pressure suit, both for fire and extreme environment (water immersion to near vacuum) protection, and as thermal blankets on the payload bay doors, fuselage, and upper wing surfaces of the Space Shuttle Orbiter. It has also been used for the airbags for the Mars Pathfinder and Mars Exploration Rover missions, the Galileo atmospheric probe, the Cassini-Huygens Titan probe, as an external covering on the AERCam Sprint, and is planned to be incorporated into NASA's upcoming Crew Exploration Vehicle.

Nomex has been used as an acoustic material in Troy, NY, at Rensselaer Polytechnic Institute's Experimental Media and Performing Arts Center (EMPAC) main concert hall. A ceiling canopy of Nomex reflects high and mid frequency sound, providing reverberation, while letting lower frequency sound partially pass through the canopy. According to RPI President Shirley Ann Jackson, EMPAC is the first venue in the world to use Nomex as an architectural material for acoustic reasons.

Nomex (like Kevlar) is also used in the production of loudspeaker drivers.

Honeycomb-structured Nomex paper is used as a spacer between layers of lead in the ATLAS Liquid Argon Calorimeter, and as a laminate core for hull and deck construction in custom boats such as Stiletto Catamarans like the Stiletto 27.

Nomex is used in industrial applications as a filter in exhaust filtration systems, typically a baghouse, that deal with hot gas emissions found in asphalt plants, cement plants, steel smelting facilities, and non-ferrous metal production facilities.

Nomex is used in some classical guitar tops in order to create a 'composite' soundboard. When Nomex is laminated between 2 spruce or cedar 'skins', a rigid and lightweight plate is produced, which can improve the efficiency of the soundboard. While the 'laminated' technique was created by Matthias Dammann, the use of Nomex within was first employed by luthier Gernot Wagner.

== History ==
The deaths in fiery crashes of race car drivers Fireball Roberts at Charlotte, and Eddie Sachs and Dave MacDonald at Indianapolis in 1964, led to the use of flame-resistant fabrics such as Nomex. In early 1966 Competition Press and Autoweek reported: "During the past season, experimental driving suits were worn by Walt Hansgen, Masten Gregory, Marvin Panch and Group 44's Bob Tullius; these four representing a fairly good cross section in the sport. The goal was to get use-test information on the comfort and laundering characteristics of Nomex. The Chrysler-Plymouth team at the recent Motor Trend 500 at Riverside also wore these suits."

== See also ==
- Aramid
- Gore-Tex
- Kevlar
- Marlan
- PET film
- Silica Aerogel
- Thermal Micrometeoroid Garment
- Twaron
- Vectran
