= Frank W. Cyr =

American educator (1900–1995)

Dr. Frank W. Cyr
- Born: July 7, 1900; Franklin, Nebraska
- Died: August 1, 1995 (aged 95); Stamford, New York
- Education: Grinnell College; University of Nebraska; Teachers College, Columbia University (Ph.D.)
- Occupations: Author; Educator
- Years active: 1930–1965
- Employer: Teachers College, Columbia University
- Notable work: school bus yellow
- Title: "Father of the Yellow School Bus"
- Children: William P. Cyr, Katherine (or Kathryn) Ruth Cyr

Frank W. Cyr (July 7, 1900 – August 1, 1995) was an American educator and author known especially for his contribution to school busing.

As a specialist in rural education, he organized the United States' first national standards conference for school transportation in 1939, starting what became an ongoing cooperative effort by those building and operating school buses. One of the most memorable accomplishments of the conference was a move to develop and standardize a highly visible color for the buses and their markings to help identify them to other motorists. Afterwards, Dr. Cyr became known as the Father of the Yellow School Bus.

== Rural youth, education, professor ==
Cyr was born July 7, 1900, on a farm close to Franklin, Nebraska.

After high school, Cyr attended Grinnell College and then in 1923 earned his BA in Education (or Agriculture) at the University of Nebraska. He became superintendent of schools in Chappell, Nebraska before continuing as a graduate student at Teachers College, Columbia University in New York City), where, by 1930, he had earned his PhD. His dissertation, Responsibility for Rural School Administrators was published by the Teachers College Bureau of Publications, the first of many of his published works.

After earning his doctorate, Cyr taught at Teachers College for over 30 years, retiring in 1965. While working in the education of teachers, he also became involved in studying and improving rural education and school transportation.

== U.S. school bus standards ==
In the 1930s, Cyr made a study of school transportation. He learned that students were riding in all kinds of vehicles, including trucks and buses of every imaginable color and condition. One district's buses sported red, white and blue decor, perhaps hoping to instill patriotism in its passengers. A Kansas district transported its students in horse-drawn wheat wagons. School bus manufacturers complained that because there were no national standards, they could not mass-produce the buses, nor make a profit and keep costs down.

In April 1939, Cyr organized a conference at Teachers College, funded by a grant from the Rockefeller Foundation for transportation officials from each of the then-48 states, as well as specialists from school bus manufacturing and paint companies.

Engineers from Blue Bird Body Co., Chevrolet, International Harvester, Dodge, and Ford Motor Company, as well as paint experts from DuPont and Pittsburgh Paint showed up. Together with the transportation administrators, they met for 7 days and agreed on 44 standards, including the color and some mechanical specs such as body length, ceiling height and aisle width.

It was at this meeting that yellow with black lettering was determined as easiest to see in the light of early morning and late afternoon. The distinctive yellow became known officially as "National School Bus Chrome" but is now known as National School Bus Glossy Yellow.

While most of those standards have long since changed, the yellow color stuck. In time, 35 U.S. states adopted the color with Minnesota as the last holdout, only changing in 1974 from 'Minnesota Golden Orange' to National School Bus Chrome.

Following the conference, Cyr, who is recorded as having always thought the choice more orange than yellow, became widely regarded as the "Father of the Yellow School Bus."

Cyr continued to be interested in school buses. In 1942, he chaired a federal conference that set school transportation policy during wartime.

In April 1989, he was honored at a luncheon at Teachers College marking the 50th anniversary of the original conference. The luncheon was held in the Grace Dodge Room at the College, where the original conference had been held.

At the luncheon, Cyr recalled that strips of different colors were hung from the wall and the participants in the 1939 conference talked until they narrowed the color down to three slightly different shades of yellow. The variation in shades was allowed, Cyr explained, because the color of the paint could not always be mixed exactly.

Cyr also said that he and the other attendees at the conference always used safety as the first criterion for the school-bus standards. "The most often asked question was 'Will this standard improve safety?'" he recalled at the 1989 luncheon.

== Rural education specialist, author ==
In 1940, Cyr served as president of the Rural Department of the National Education Association and authored A Policy for Rural Education in the United States, published that year as the Rural Department's yearbook. Cyr was also the author of The Small School in Wartime (1942) and Rural Education in the United States (1943), which was translated into both Spanish and Portuguese. He was the coauthor of The Small High School at Work (1936), An Introduction to Modern Education (1936) and Planning the Rural School Building (1949).

== Legacy ==
Frank W. Cyr died at the age of 95 in Stamford, New York, in 1995.

Dr. Cyr had become a Professor Emeritus of Rural Education at Columbia University Teachers College in New York.

As of September 1995, a television station in Stamford, New York, broadcast advanced placement classes to the rural schools of the area. That station was located in the Frank W. Cyr Educational Center of the Board of Cooperative Educational Services.

He is survived by his son William, 3 grandchildren and 6 great-grandchildren.
