= ISO 20471 =

ISO 20471:2013
- High visibility clothing — Test methods and requirements
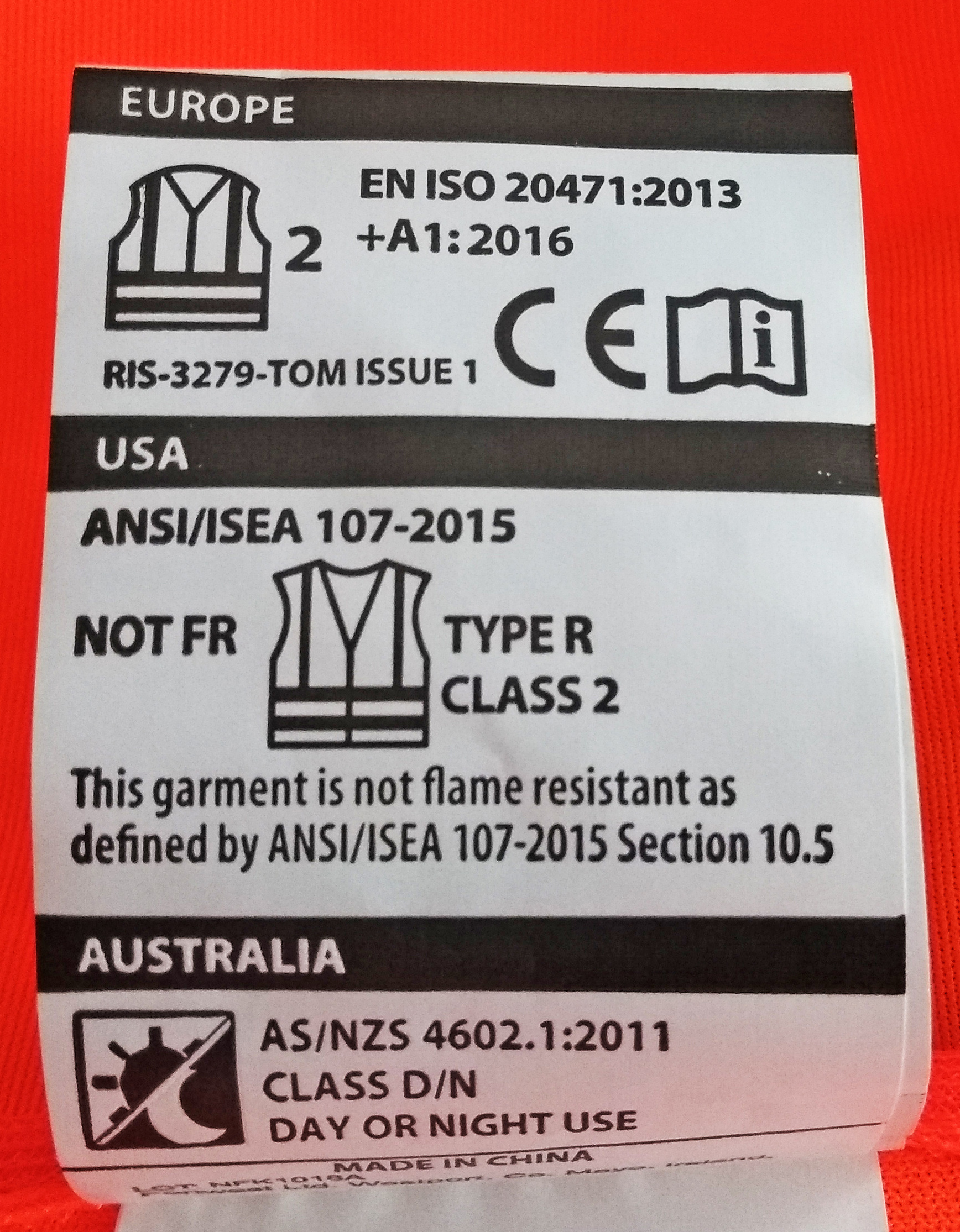
- A standards tag on a high visibility vest
- Abbreviation: ISO 20471
- First published: March 2013; 12 years ago
- Latest version: 1; 2013
- Organization: International Organization for Standardization
- Committee: ISO/TC 94/SC 13 - Protective clothing
- Related standards: ANSI/ISEA 107-2020 (USA); AS/NZS 4602.1:2011 (Australia/New Zealand); CSA Z96-15 (2020) (Canada); JIS T 8127:2020 (Japan)
- Domain: high visibility clothing design and certification
- Website: www.iso.org/standard/42816.html

ISO 20471 is an International Organization for Standardization technical standard describing requirements for high-visibility clothing, along with methods for testing and confirming that clothing meets those requirements. The standard was reviewed in 2018 and undergoing its routine 5 year review in 2023.
