= First Student UK =

Yellow school bus service in the United Kingdom

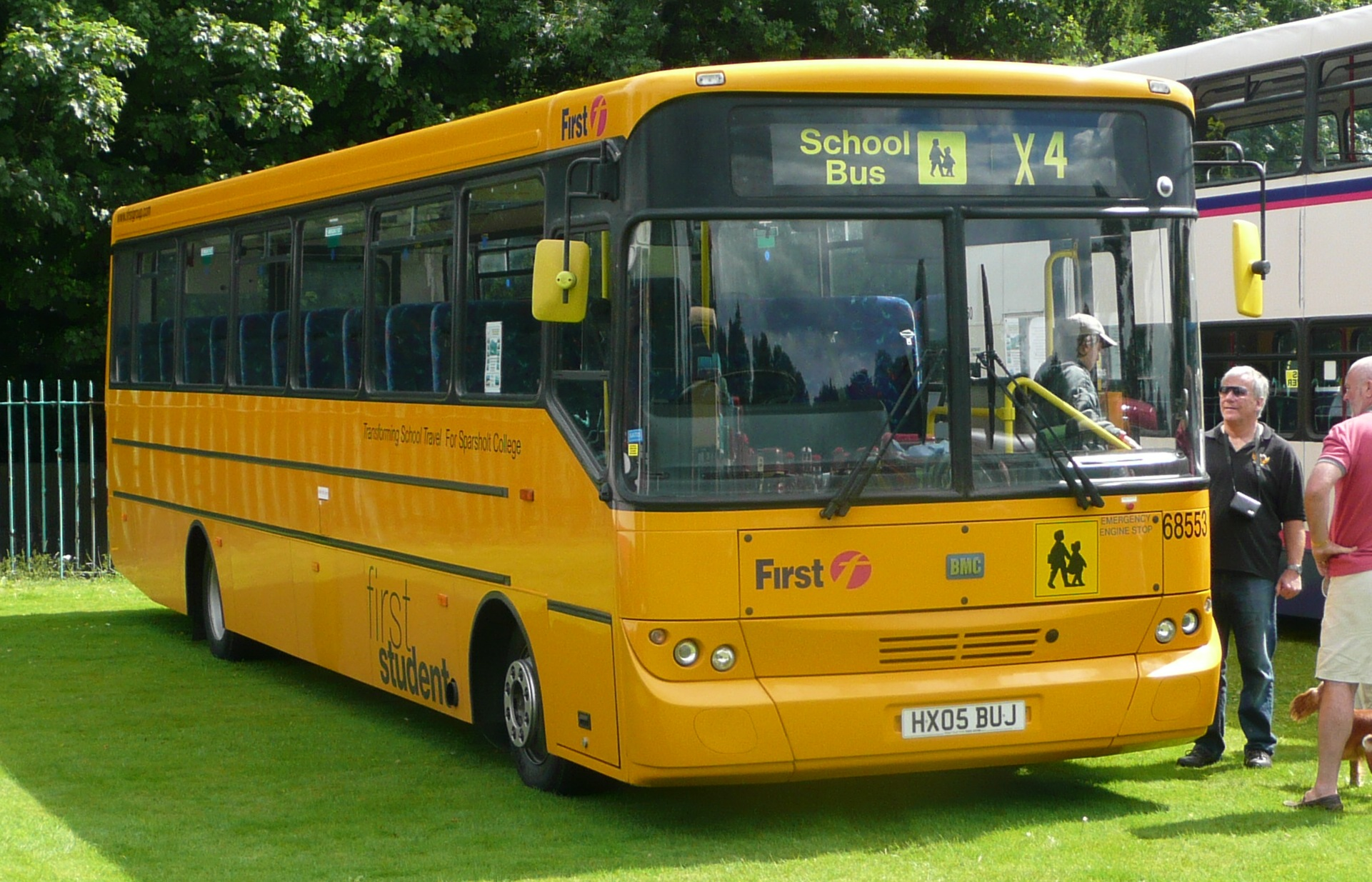
- First Hampshire & Dorset operated First Student BMC 1100FE in 2008
- Parent: FirstGroup
- Founded: 2000
- Headquarters: London
- Service area: Great Britain
- Service type: School bus
- Fleet: 107 (April 2006)
- Operator: First Aberdeen; First Berkshire & The Thames Valley; First Cymru; First Essex; First Glasgow; First Greater Manchester; First Hampshire & Dorset; First Northampton; First West Yorkshire
- Managing Director: Linda Howard
- Website: First Student

First Student UK was the brand used by FirstGroup for student transport in the United Kingdom. The brand was originally used by First Student in the United States for school transport there, and was expanded to the United Kingdom in 2000.

== Development ==
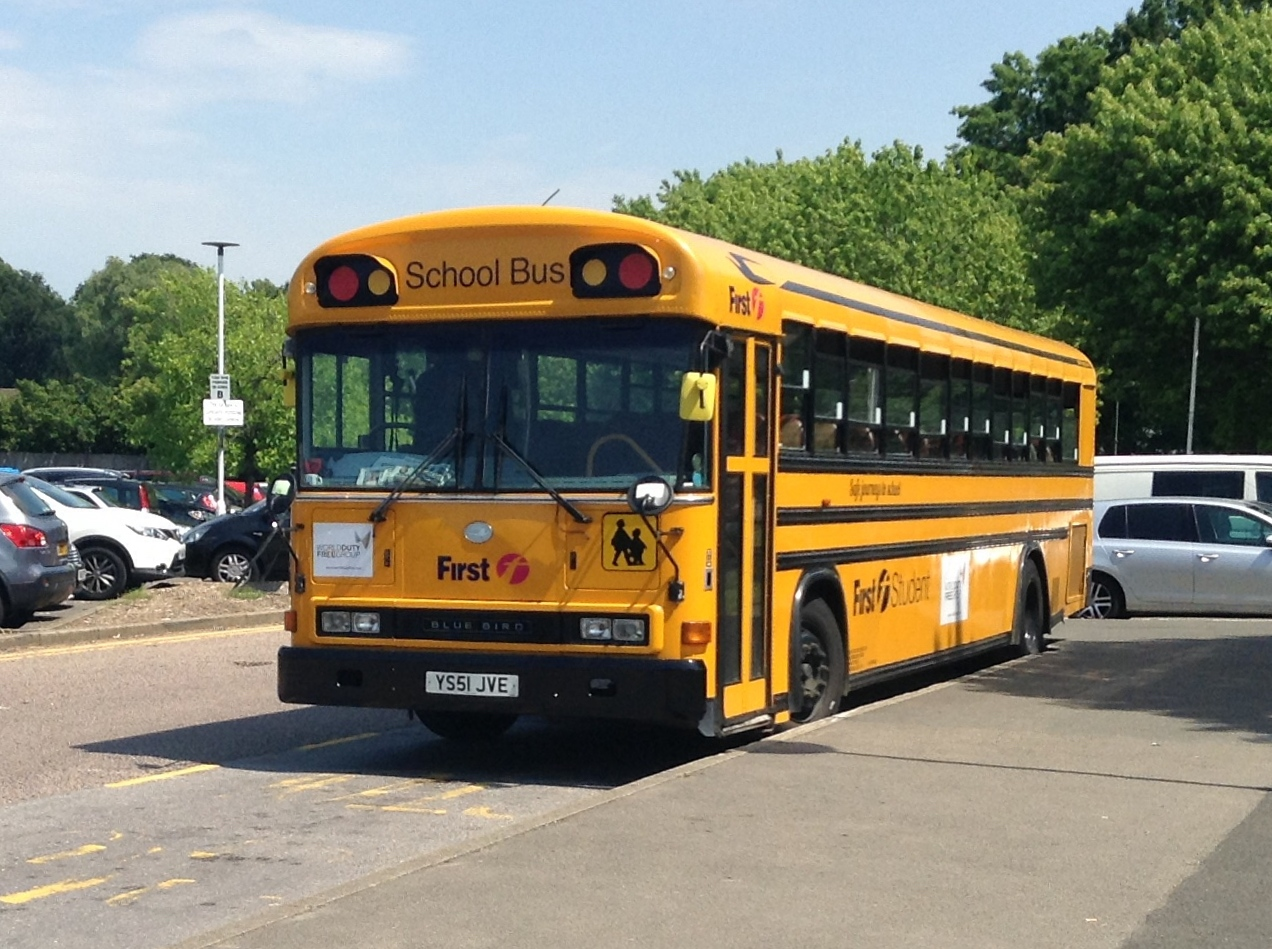
First Berkshire & The Thames Valley Blue Bird TC/2000 in July 2015

First West Yorkshire successfully piloted one of the first school bus schemes in the Huddersfield and Calderdale area between 2000 and 2001, utilising a fleet of Blue Bird buses painted in school bus yellow and run on 'closed door' home-to-school services. This followed a scheme introduced by Staffordshire County Council in 1998, which made use of a fleet of 15 yellow Blue Bird buses.

In 2002, another early scheme began in Wrexham, Wales. It was contracted to First Cymru, who began to operate the scheme in June of that year. FirstGroup's chief executive Moir Lockhead said "we believe that the yellow school bus offers the safest, most reliable way to transport children to and from school". By October 2002, FirstGroup's first Welsh scheme had proved successful enough for the fleet of buses to be doubled.

As further schemes developed, First became more involved in setting up schemes. To develop this system in the United Kingdom, the company appointed Linda Howard, who had owned and operated her own school bus company in the United States before it was acquired by First, as managing director.

First Berkshire, already running the Runnymede First Student service, won the contract from Surrey County Council in 2005 to operate the 'Ride Pegasus!' school bus scheme, although using buses in a different livery. However, this ended in July 2010 following the withdrawal of funding.

In December 2007, a yellow school bus visited Perth, Scotland, to test reactions. FirstGroup suggested that their research shows 86% of British parents would like to send their children to school in dedicated buses. Another bus toured across the United Kingdom on trials during 2008, with former Home Secretary David Blunkett working with First to campaign for wider use of their school bus system.

== Operations ==
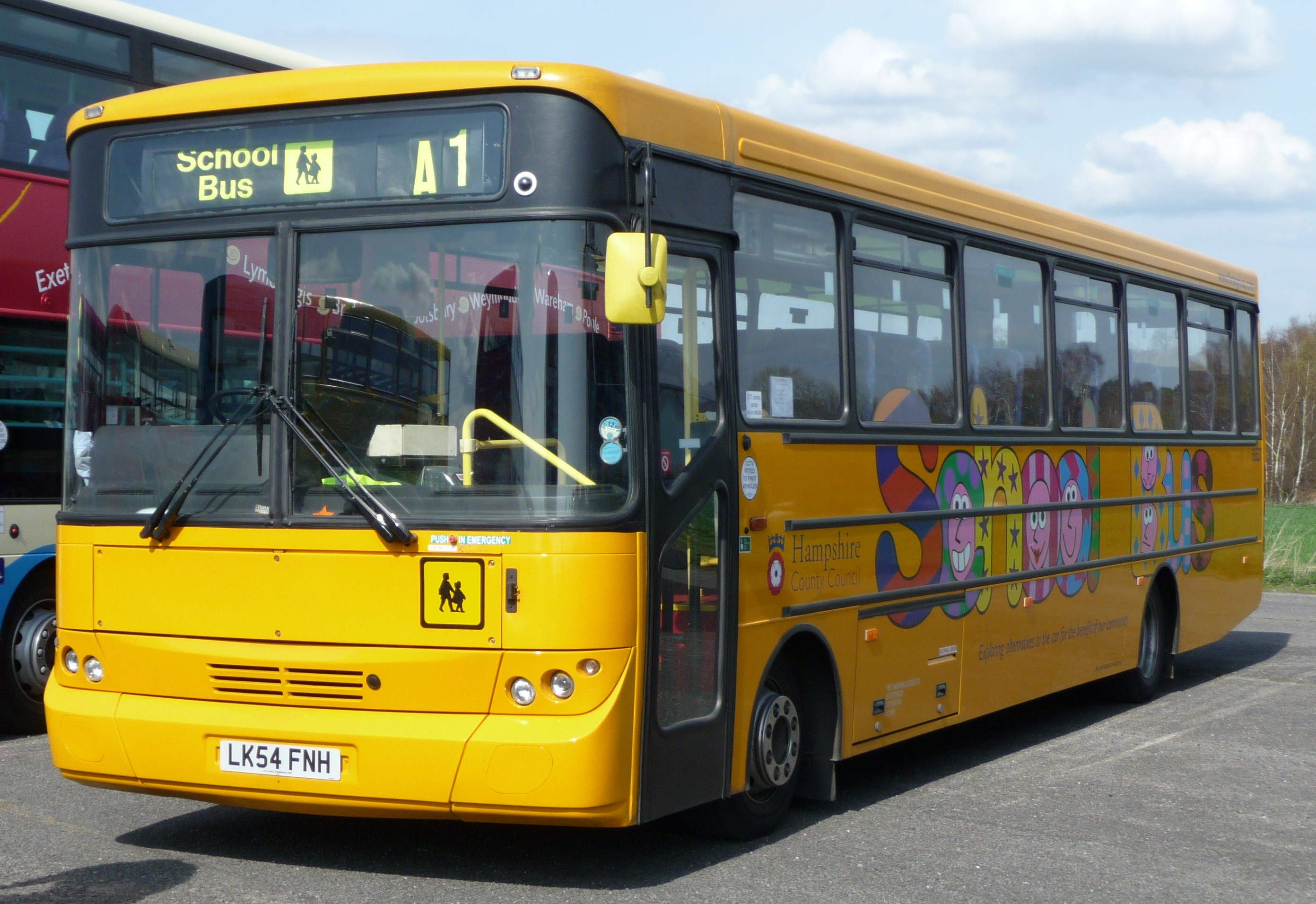
First Hampshire & Dorset operated First Student BMC 1100FE, seen in 2009. It is run for Hampshire County Council.

First Student UK took 8,000 students to and from school in the UK every day. Fifteen school bus systems were operated, two in Scotland, two in Wales and the rest in England. The buses were run on door-to-door services direct to and from schools, with no adult members of the public allowed to board, and were equipped with seatbelts as standard, with all schoolchildren aboard having a designated seat on a bus. By April 2006, the scheme had achieved a 50% modal shift from car to bus on school runs served by the scheme.

In contrast to the North American division, where school busing is a primary function, First Student UK takes advantage of the existence of a First Group operating depot throughout the country; some areas where First did not operate, had to have new depots opened to operate the buses. The first schemes also had buses built like traditional US school buses, whereas later schemes have more conventional European designs. First Student schemes were run on behalf of the local authority by an existing subsidiary of First or subcontracted to an independent operator where they do not have a presence.

In one of the biggest First Student schemes, First West Yorkshire was the largest provider of yellow school buses on behalf of West Yorkshire Metro, running 81 school buses every day on Metro's My Bus scheme in Halifax. These services were operated using a fleet of BMC Condor buses. First Berkshire, meanwhile, launched a small scheme in Runnymede in February 2002, Another scheme was run on behalf of Hampshire County Council, with handful of buses operated to selected schools by First Hampshire & Dorset, and a bus was also demonstrated in the Greater Manchester area during September 2000 by First Manchester.

=== Ride Pegasus! ===

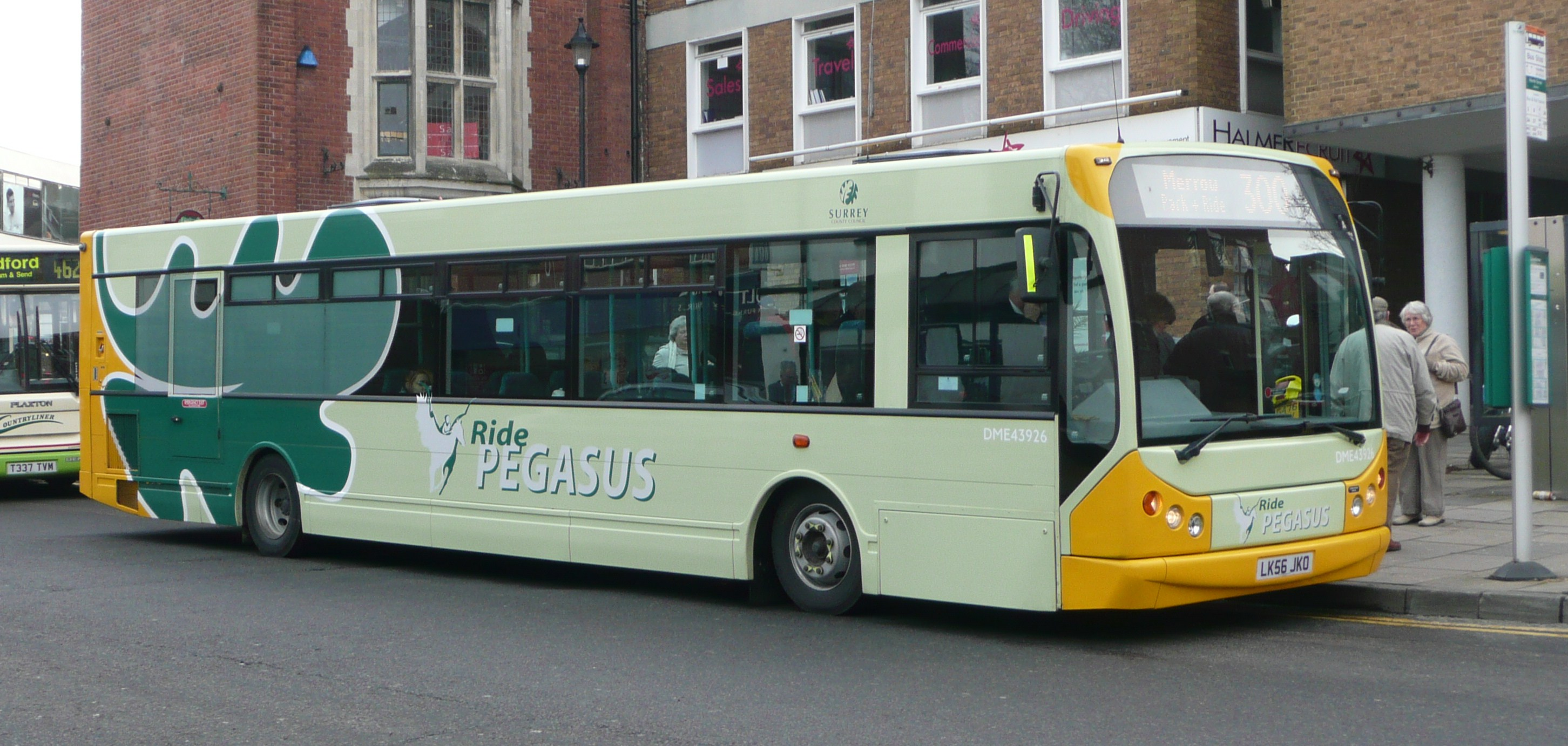
A Ride Pegasus East Lancs Myllennium bodied Dennis Dart SLF in Guildford in January 2009

'Ride Pegasus!' was a school bus scheme run by First Berkshire & The Thames Valley under contract to Surrey Country Council. The scheme, which required 22 buses, served 14 primary schools in the Guildford area and carried 850 children each day for a cost of £900,000 per year. Some non-school "Access Bus" services, primarily for senior citizens, were also run, as was the Guildford park & ride route 300 to Merrow. Buses were run from the council depot in Merrow Lane, which was treated as an outstation to one of First Berkshire's main depots. Ride Pegasus stopped running on 23 July 2010, at the end of the 2010 school year, due to the withdrawal of financing by the council.

The intention to start a school bus operation in Surrey was first announced by Surrey County Council in 2002, and was initially named Project Pegasus. In April 2005 the Department of Transport branded the plan, now known as the Pegasus School Bus Project, "low value for money" and decided not to fund a pilot scheme. However, by January 2006 funding had been arranged for a pilot scheme to begin at Tillingbourne School in Chilworth, with an official launch on 17 March 2006. Over the following five years it was expanded to cover 14 schools in the area, although it continued to be only a pilot with a projected end date of December 2010.

In September 2009 Surrey County Council announced a decision to cease funding the program from July 2010, citing the cost of £900,000 per year as too expensive for a system which benefited only 1% of Surrey schoolchildren. A petition against the decision received 1,500 signatures in 11 days. The decision was reviewed in November 2009 with a view to extending the service to operate until July 2011, but despite criticism was not overturned. The park and ride contract also ended in July 2010; it was initially due to finish in December 2010, but was brought forward to coincide with the end of the school bus operation.

The 22 buses used on the service returned to owners Surrey County Council at the end of the scheme. All were East Lancs Myllennium bodied Dennis Dart SLFs.
