= Fire engine red =

Informal name for an intense, bright red

Color coordinates
- Hex triplet: #CE2029
- sRGB^{B} (r, g, b): (206, 32, 41)
- HSV (h, s, v): (357°, 84%, 81%)
- CIELCh_{uv} (L, C, h): (45, 131, 11°)
- ISCC–NBS descriptor: Vivid red
- B: Normalized to [0–255] (byte)

Fire engine red, also known as fire truck red in North America, is an informal name for a bright red commonly used on emergency vehicles in many countries on fire service vehicles, such as fire engines. The name does not refer to any particular shade of red; different fire services may have their own specifications. Bright red has long been used on fire vehicles.

== Background ==
Traditional fire departments in large U.S. central cities and major metropolitan areas use this color on fire engines, but many suburbs and smaller cities use the color lime or bright yellow for their fire engines because of its greater visibility at night. In the U.K. the fire service added the more visible Battenburg markings in fire-engine red and retro-reflective yellow, often on a predominantly red vehicle.

Initial research into fire appliance visibility was conducted by the Lanchester College of Technology and the Fire Brigade in Coventry, in the UK in about 1965. It concluded that under the range of artificial street lighting in common use at the time, yellow better retained its conspicuity than red. Yellow was also more conspicuous in general road conditions in the daytime and during inclement weather. Research conducted by Stephen Solomon, a New York optometrist, promoted the use of "lime yellow" in the United States from the mid-1970s. Solomon conducted studies of the rate of vehicle accidents involving fire apparatus, concluding that the more conspicuously colored fire apparatus suffered a lower accident rate than the less conspicuous red used by the same fire department.

Further research supporting the use of yellow for all emergency vehicles was published in 1978 in Australia.

== Gallery ==
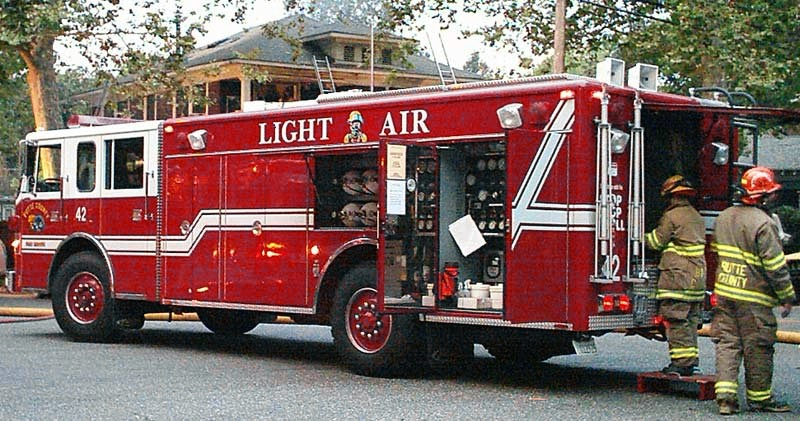
American fire truck in Butte County, California.

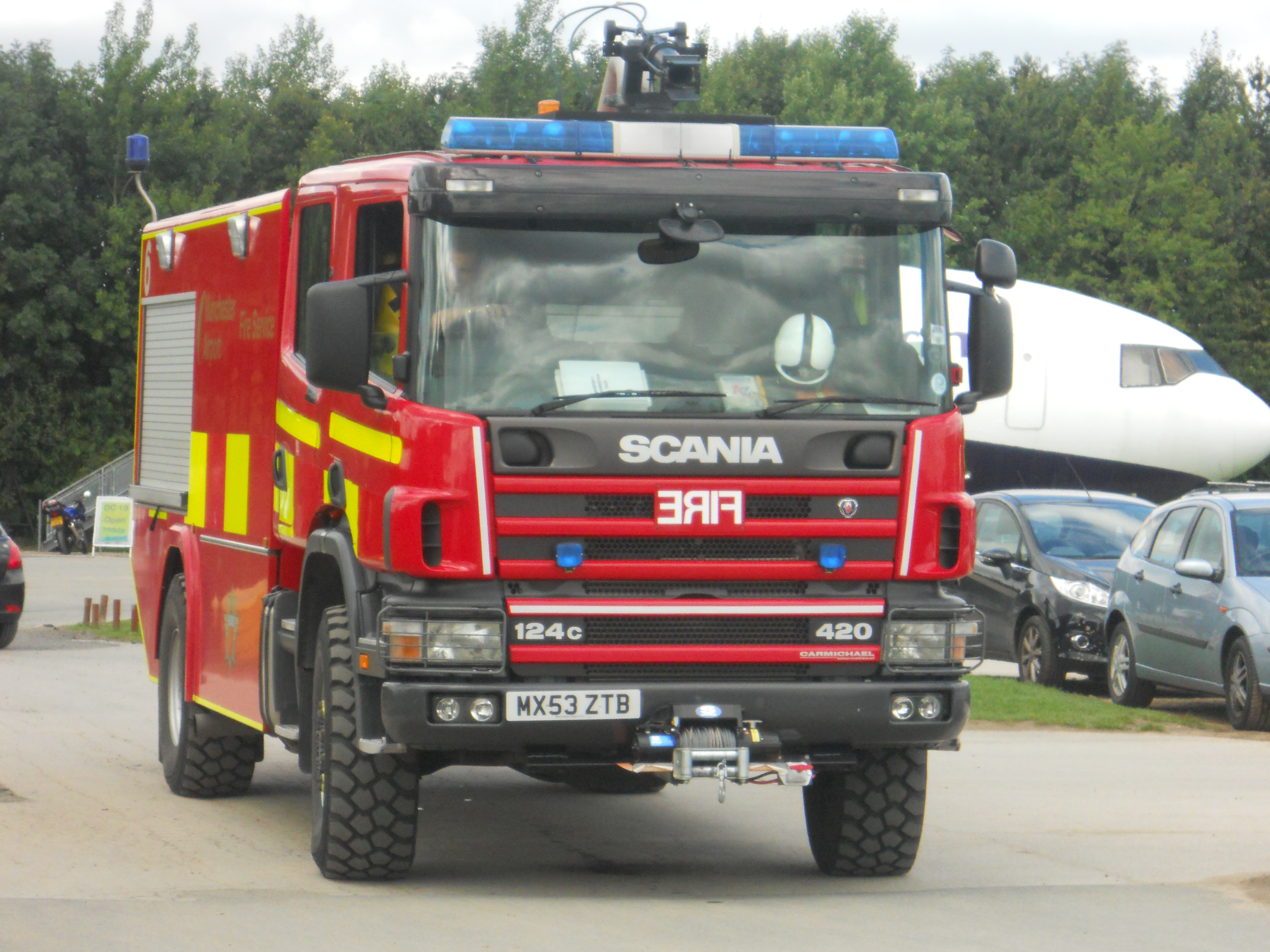
Red fire appliance with half-Battenburg side markings at Manchester Airport, England

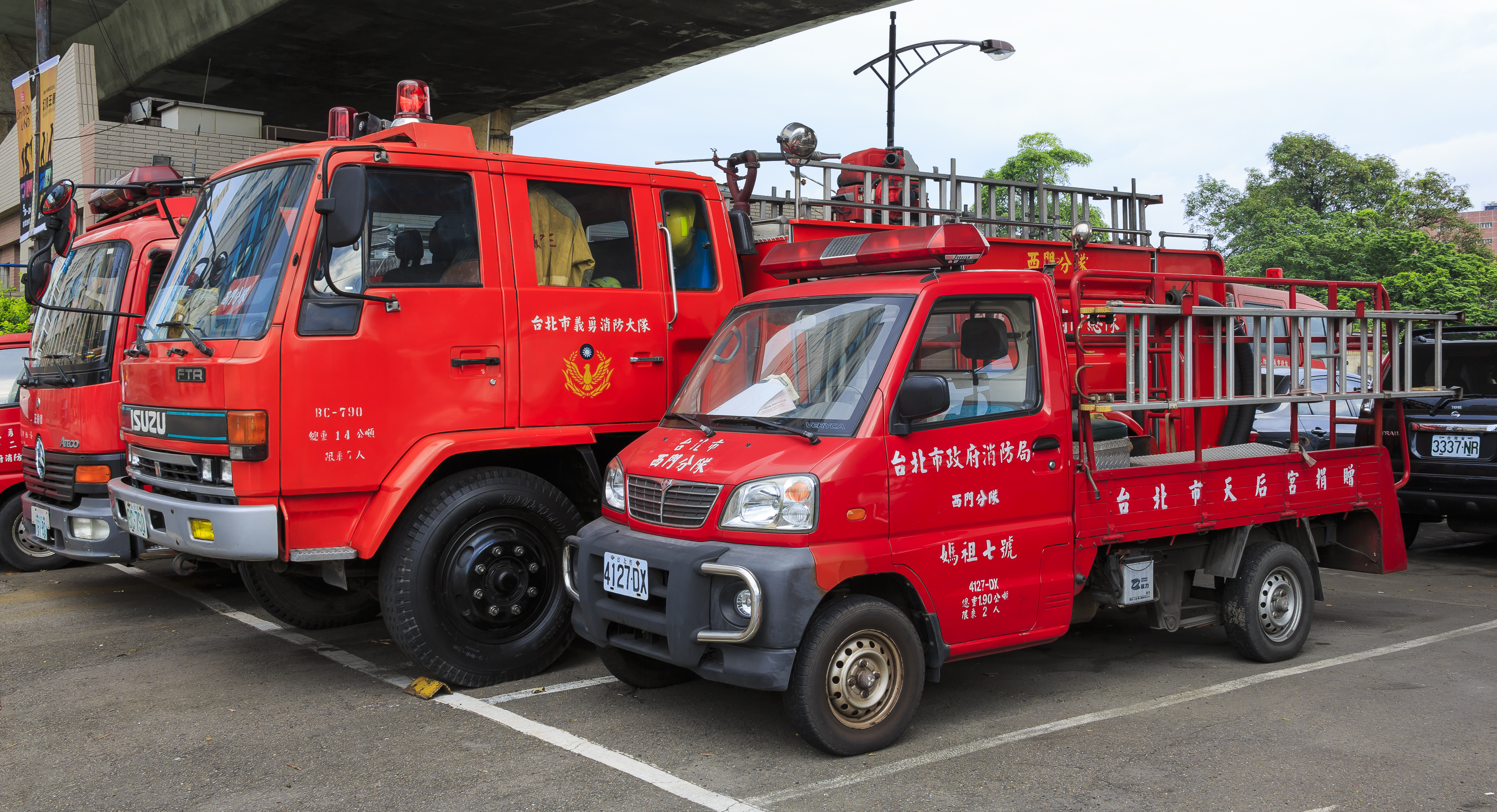
Firefighting trucks of Taipei City Fire Department, Taipei, Taiwan

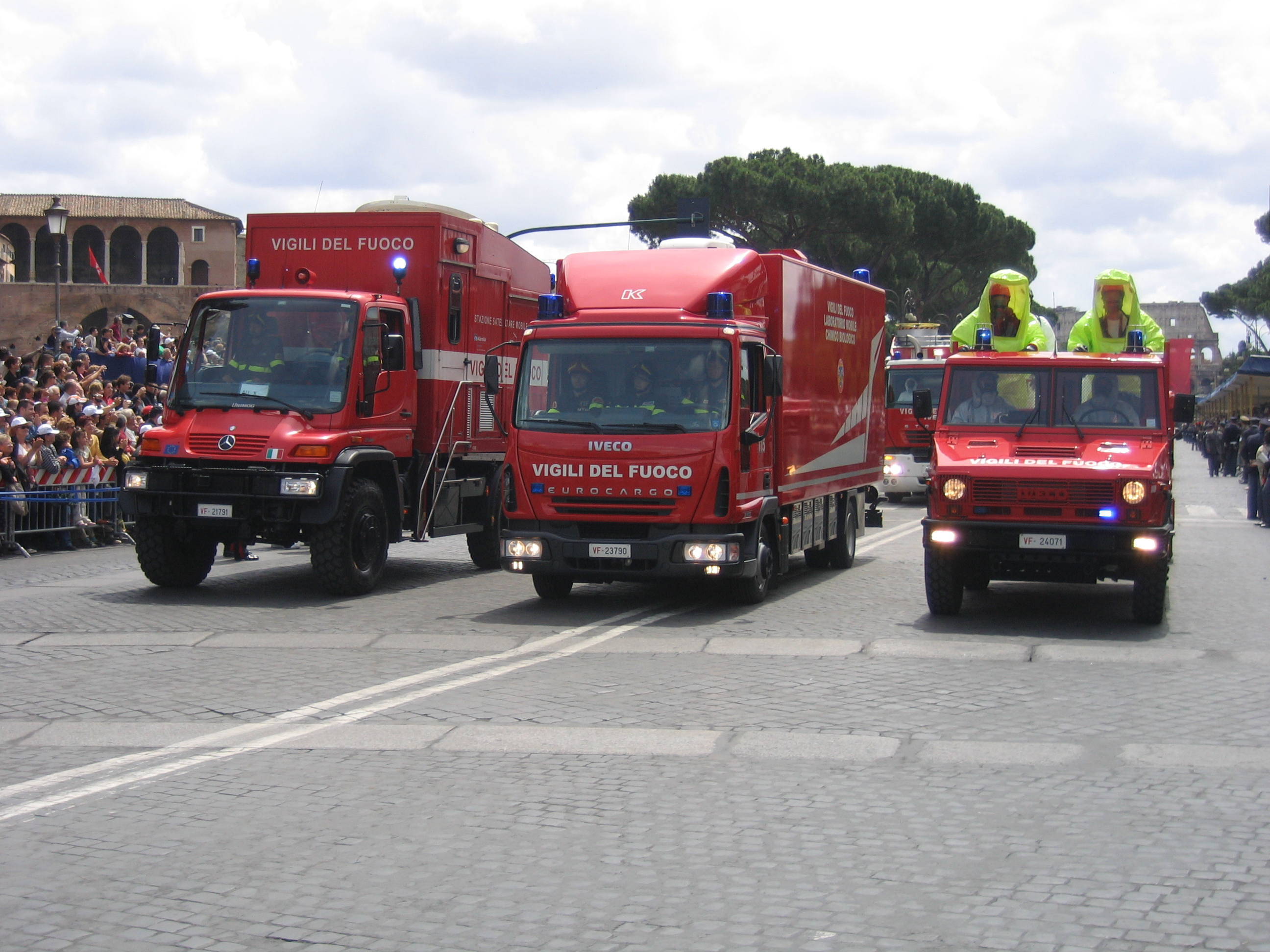
Italian fire trucks

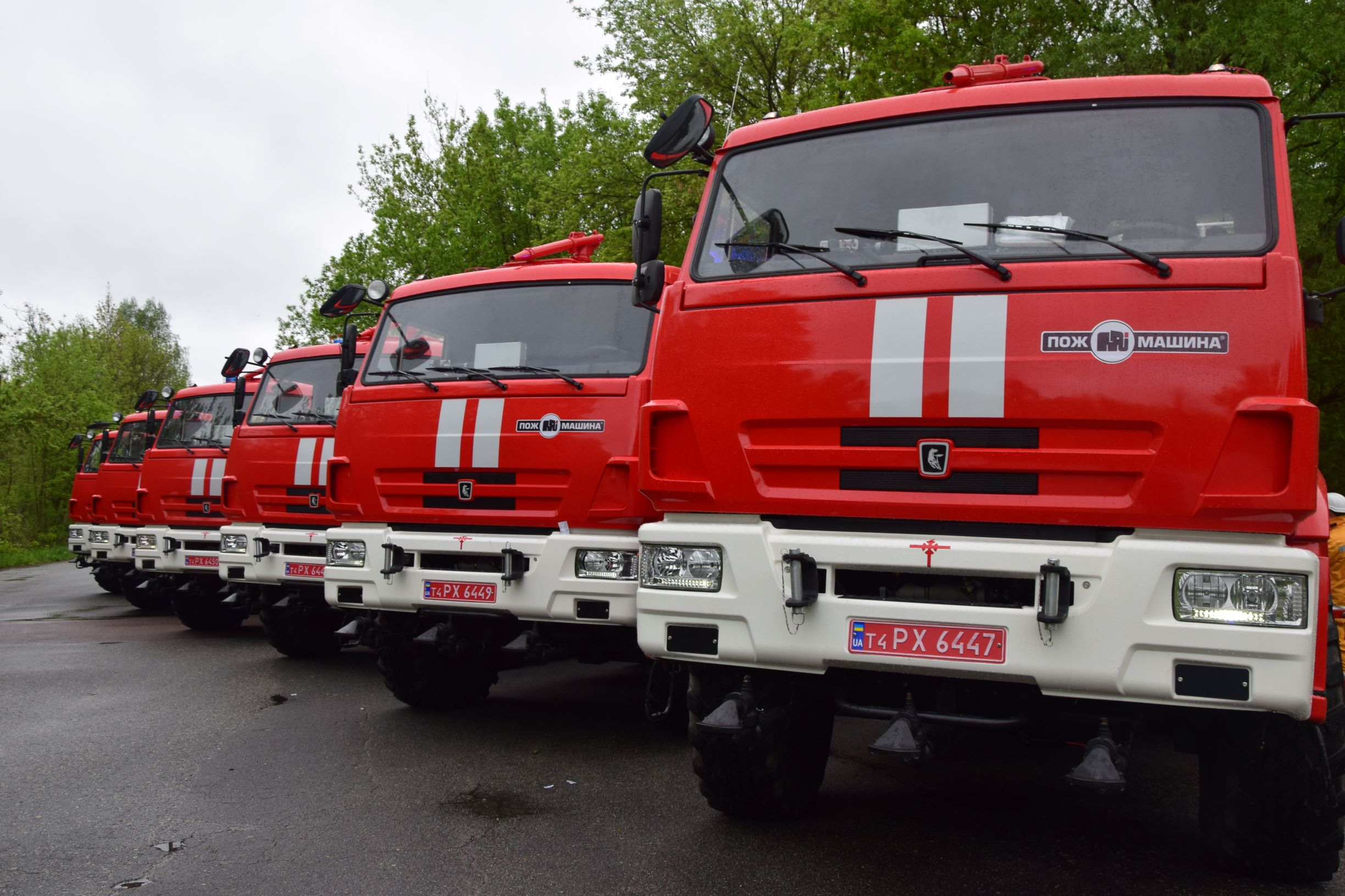
Ukrainian fire engines

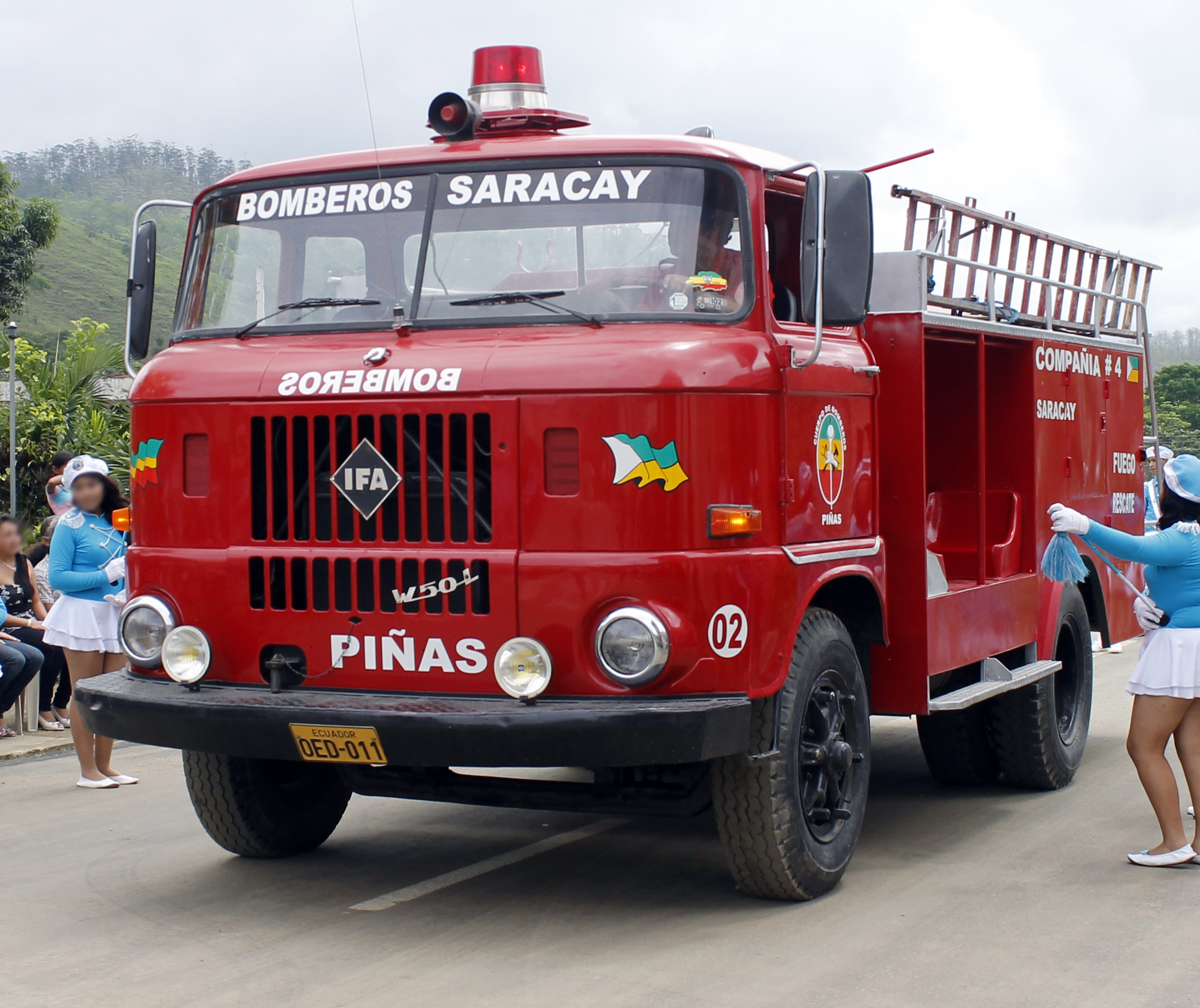
Fire engine from Piñas on parade

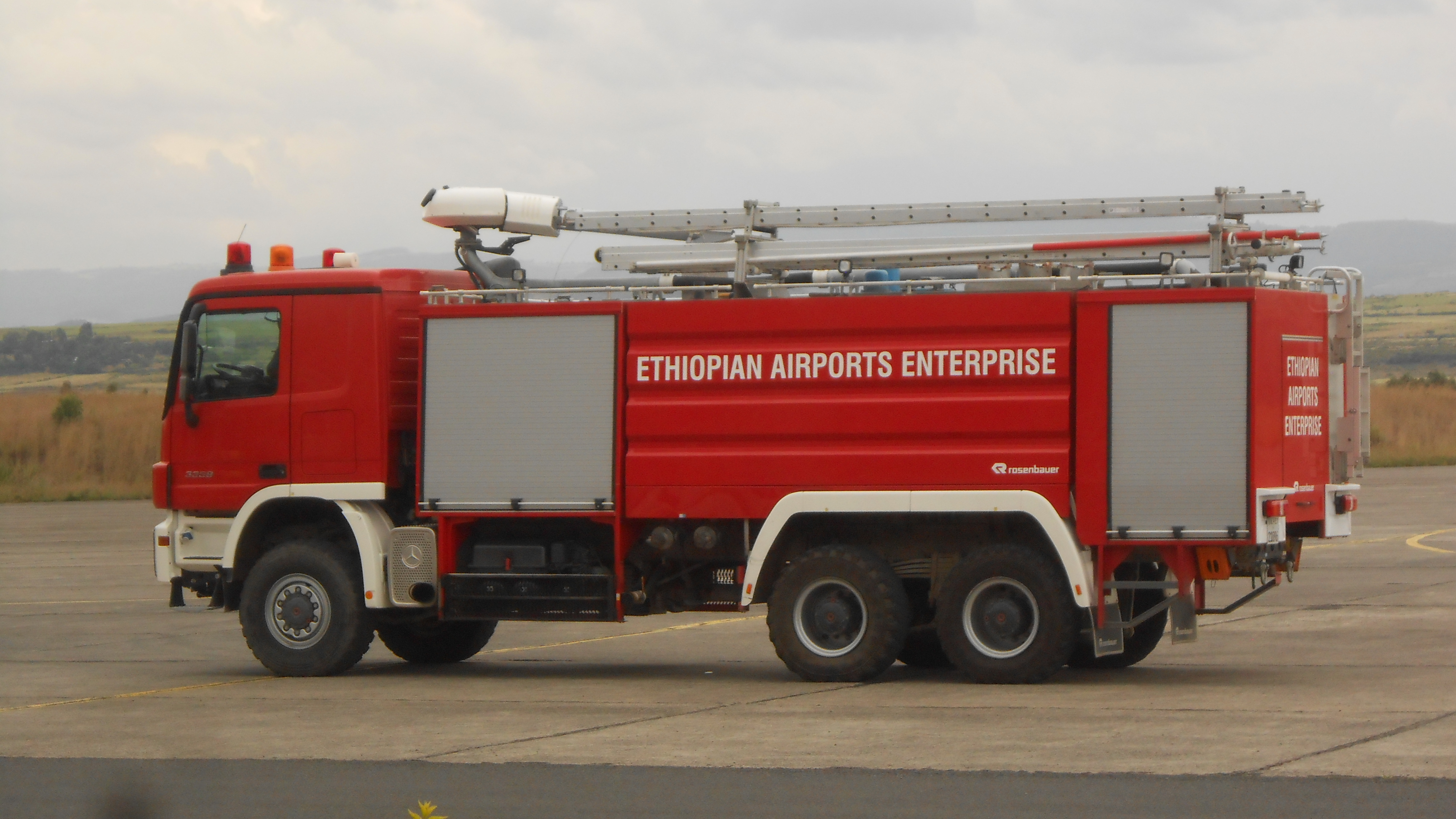
Ethiopian fire truck at Gondar Airport

== See also ==
- Green Goddess
- International orange
- List of colors
- Safety orange
- School bus yellow
- Fire engine
