= Retroglo =

Highly-Reflective Used in Safety Clothing

Retroglo is a reflective yarn designed to increase nighttime safety. It is made of 3M Scotchlite Reflective Material and laminated to a polyester film for added strength. Retroglo is used for a wide variety of applications including high-visibility clothing for joggers, walkers, bicycle riders, and highway workers.

== Characteristics ==
Retroglo is composed of 50,000 minute glass beads per square inch. The material is retroreflective, meaning it reflects light back to a light source, such as toward a car's headlights. The glass beads used in Retroglo are much smaller than the beads used in reflective road surface marking paint used on highways. Retroglo can be woven, braided or knit into fabrics or into trim to be applied to fabric.

== Construction ==
3M Scotchlite Reflective Material is laminated in wide rolls on either one or both sides of a polyester film. The wide rolls are slit to narrow widths to make Retroglo yarns which have a rectangular cross section. The width, which has the retroreflective surface, is always wider than the thickness with standard widths of 1/69", 1/32", and 1/23". The breaking strength of Retroglo is 250 grams and yield point is 15-20 grams.

== Composition ==
	Style 2P1	Style 2P2
Polyester	27. 5%	16. 0%
Glass Beads	50. 5%	59. 0%
Phenolic Resin	11. 0%	12. 5%
Urethane Adhesive	11. 0%	12. 5%
