= School bus yellow =

Color used on North American school buses

National School Bus Glossy Yellow (AMS-STD 13432)

Color coordinates
- Hex triplet: #F5A500
- sRGB^{B} (r, g, b): (245, 165, 0)
- HSV (h, s, v): (40°, 100%, 96%)
- CIELCh_{uv} (L, C, h): (74, 99, 48°)
- Source: AMS Standard Color Chart/
- ISCC–NBS descriptor: Vivid yellow
- B: Normalized to [0–255] (byte)

School bus yellow is a color that was specifically formulated for use on school buses in North America in 1939. Originally officially named National School Bus Chrome, the color is now officially known in Canada and the United States as National School Bus Glossy Yellow.

The original pigment for this color was monoclinic lead(II) chromate ("chrome yellow") which had superior steel-protecting properties compared to other pigments. Due to lead chromate's toxicity, a result of both its lead and chromate content, and because of lead sulfide darkening after exposure to air, the pigment was initially replaced by a mixture of cadmium sulfide ("cadmium yellow") and enough cadmium orange or selenium pigments to produce the equivalent color. However, cadmium is also an expensive and toxic heavy metal, so many saturated-color pigments are now azo-based organics.

== Origin ==
In April 1939, Frank W. Cyr, a professor at Teachers College, Columbia University, in New York, organized a conference that established 44 uniform national design, construction, and safety standards for school buses in America, including the exterior body color. The yellow-orange color was selected because black lettering on it was most legible in semi-darkness, and because it was conspicuous at a distance and unusual enough to become associated with school buses and groups of children in a route.

Cyr became known as the "Father of the Yellow School Bus."

Transportation officials from each of the then 48 states, representatives from bus chassis and body manufacturers, and paint experts from DuPont and Pittsburgh Paints participated in the conference, which was funded by a $5,000 grant) from the Rockefeller Foundation. The yellow-orange color, in three slight variants to allow for different paint formulations, was adopted by the National Bureau of Standards (now the National Institute of Standards and Technology) as Federal Standard No. 595a, Color 13432.

== Outside North America ==
North American-style yellow school buses are being introduced in some parts of the United Kingdom, prompted by corporate links to the American industry, for example First Student UK, or a desire to re-brand school buses, such as West Yorkshire Metro's Mybus.

== Examples ==
Examples of buses in school bus yellow

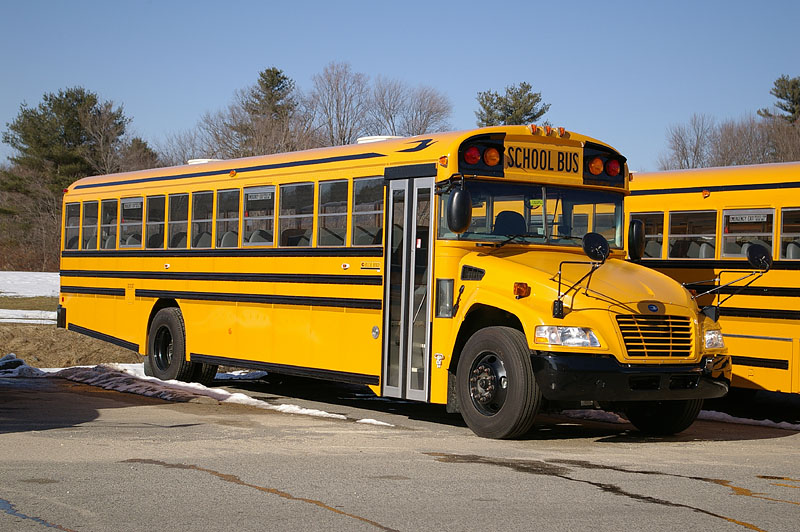
A typical school bus in the United States

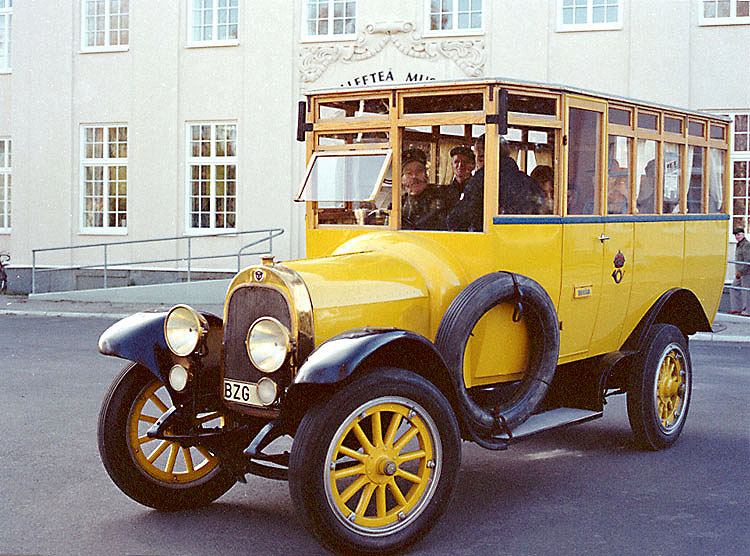
Swedish Scania-Vabis postbus from mid-1920s

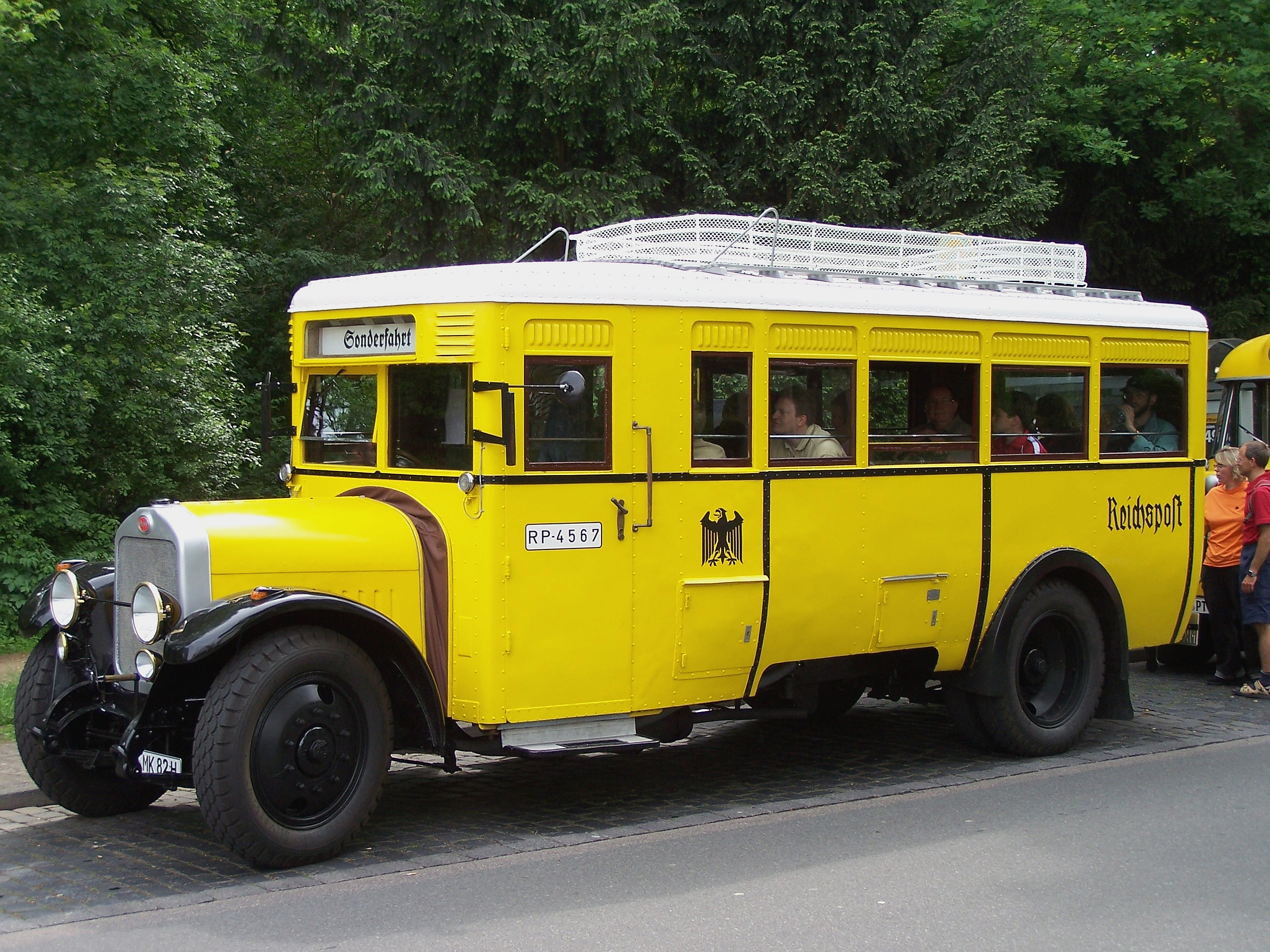
German postbus from 1925

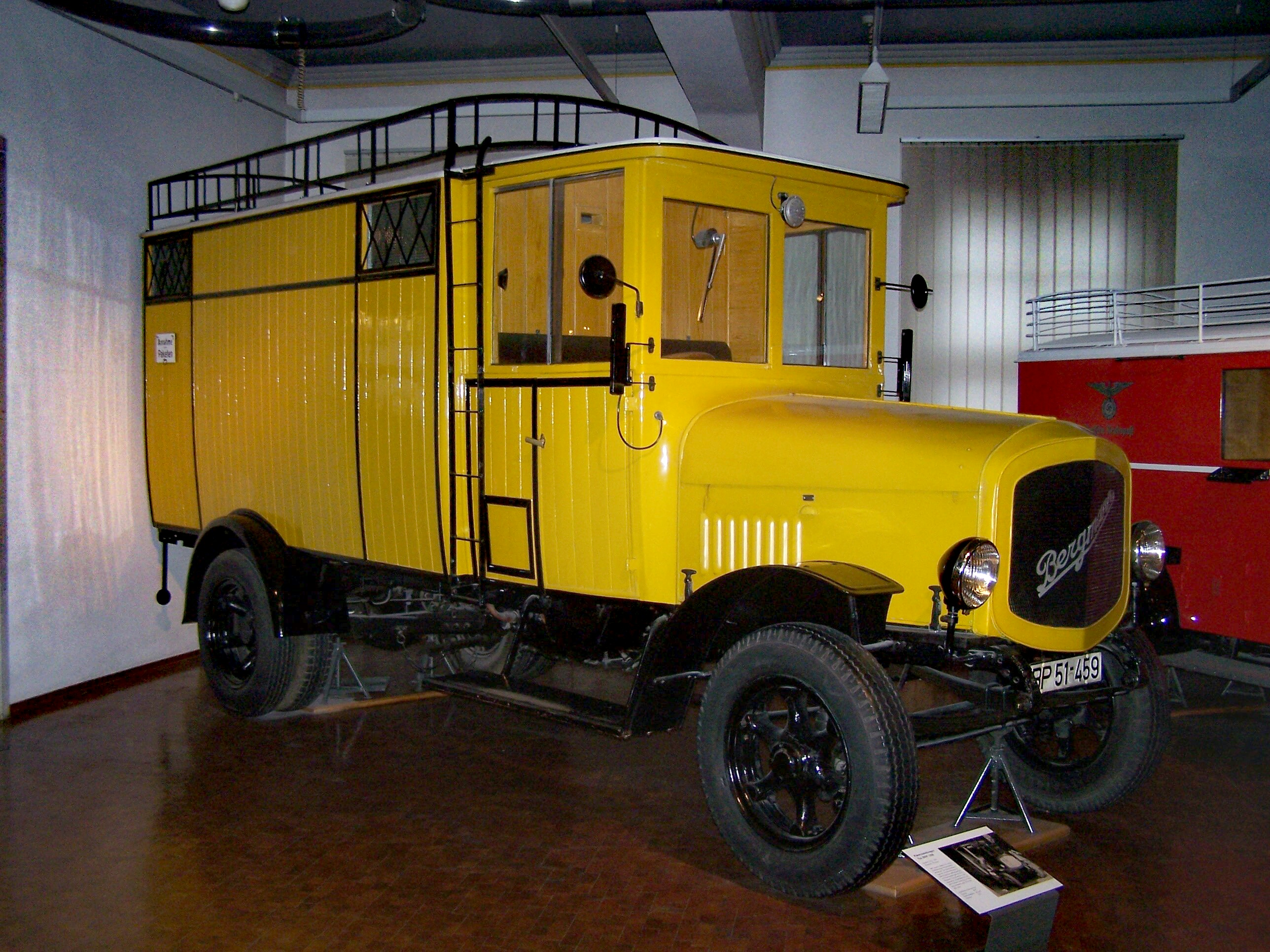
German Reichspost parcel delivery van from mid-1920s

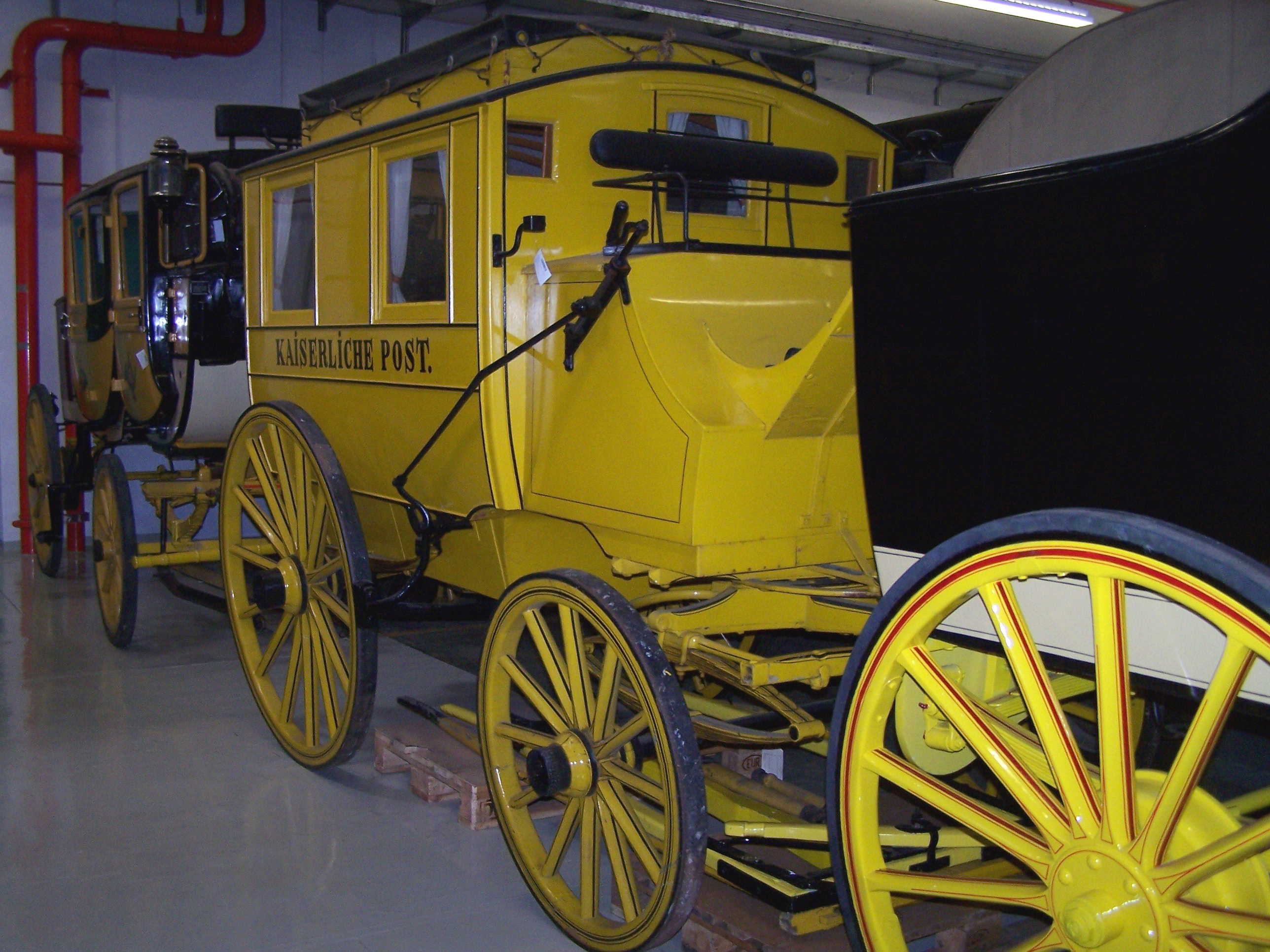
Nineteenth century German Reichspost mail coach for both passengers and mail

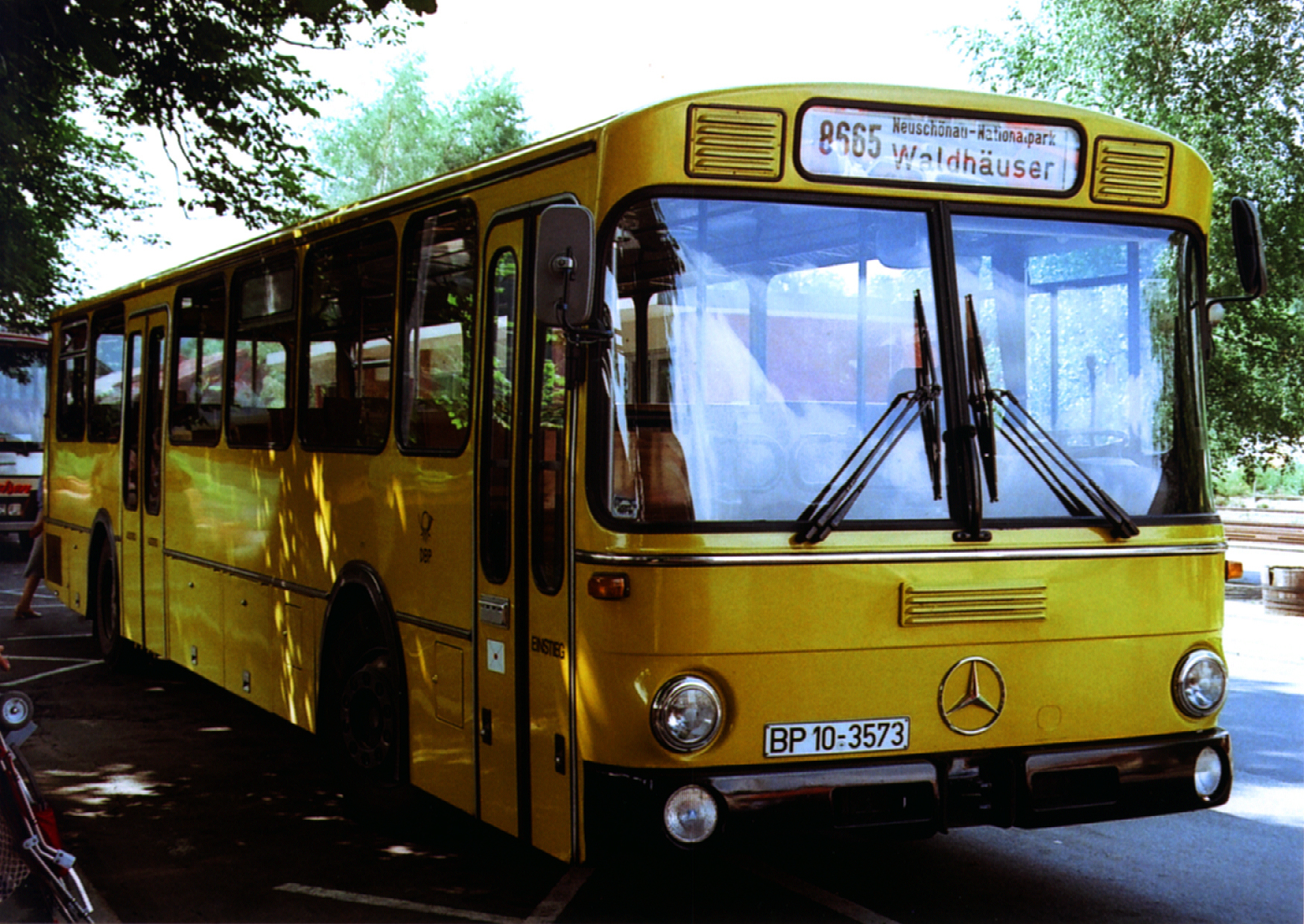
German postbus (1980s)

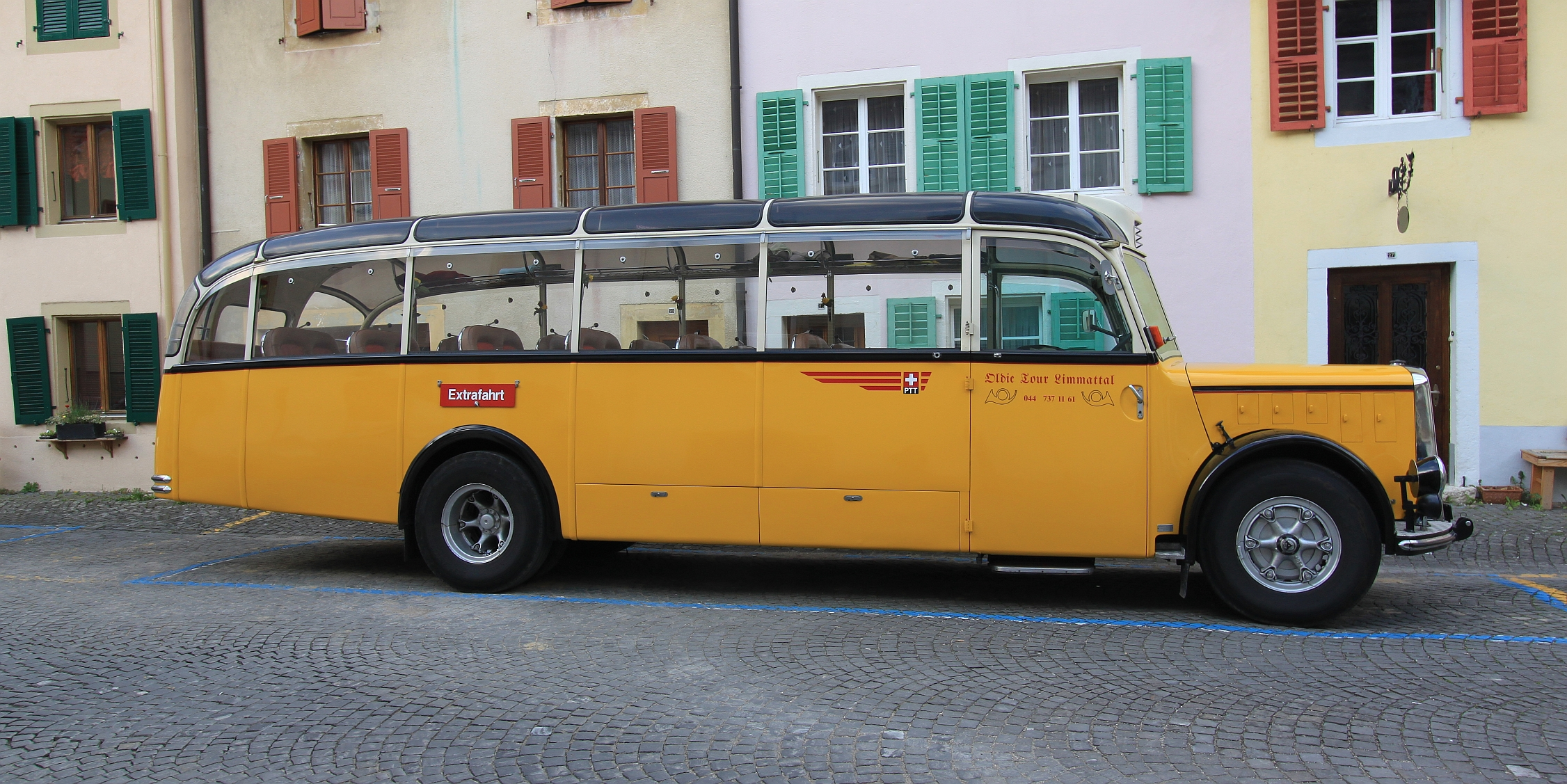
Swiss Saurer postbus from 1953

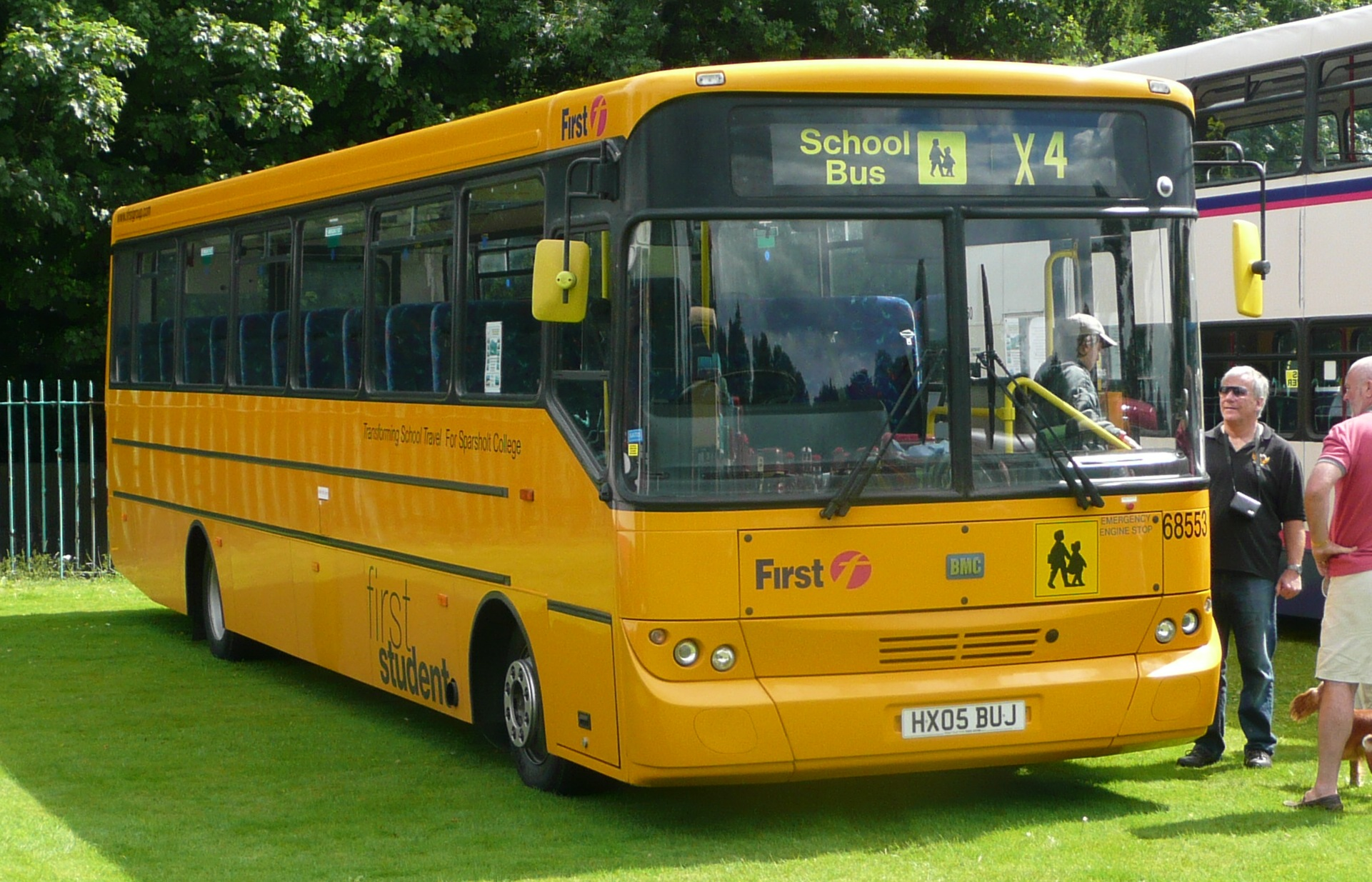
A First Student UK school bus painted in American school bus yellow

A Hong Kong nanny van in yellow

== See also ==
- School bus (main article)
- New York City taxi color regulations
- Fire engine red
- International orange
- Safety orange
- List of colors
