= High-visibility clothing =

Safety clothing

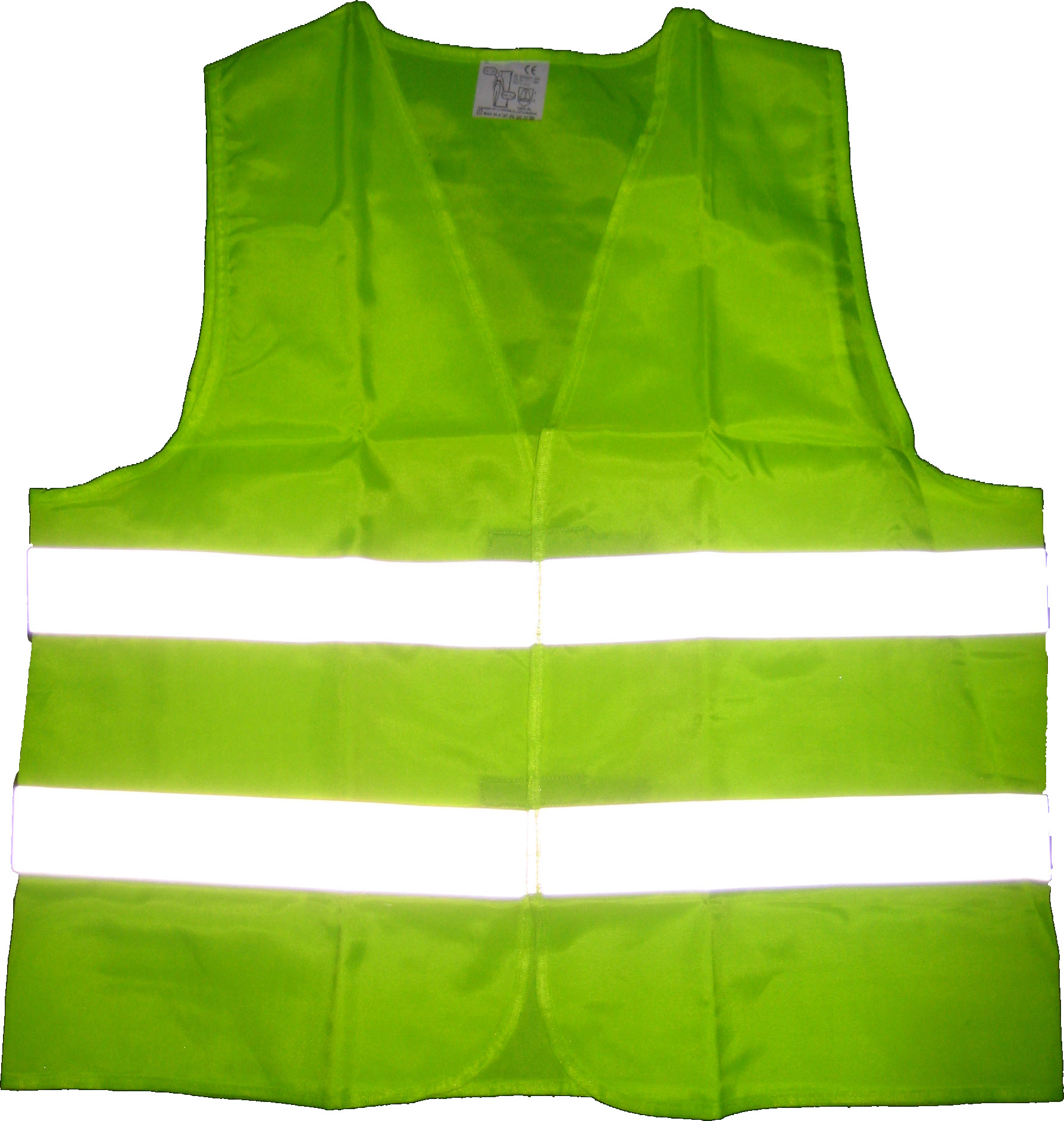
Fluorescent green safety vest. Retroreflective stripes are optimal for low-light conditions, but do not define the meaning of hi viz clothing.

High-visibility clothing (often shortened to hi vis or hi viz) is any clothing worn that is photoluminescent (e.g., fluorescent), highly reflective, or of a color that is easily discernible from any background. It is most commonly worn on the torso and arm area of the body. Health and safety regulations often require the use of high visibility clothing as it is a form of personal protective equipment. Many colors of high visibility vests are available, with yellow and orange being the most common examples. Colors other than yellow or orange may not provide adequate conspicuity for conformity to standards such as ISO 20471.

As a form of personal protective equipment, high-visibility clothing is worn to increase a person's visibility and therefore prevent accidents caused by persons not being seen. As a result, it is often worn in occupations where hazardous situations are created by moving vehicles or low lighting conditions. These occupations include railway and road workers, airport workers and emergency services. Cyclists and motorcyclists may also use high-visibility clothing to increase their visibility when operating amongst motor traffic. Hunters may be required to wear designated high-visibility clothing to prevent accidental shooting.

== Effectiveness ==
=== Motorcyclists ===
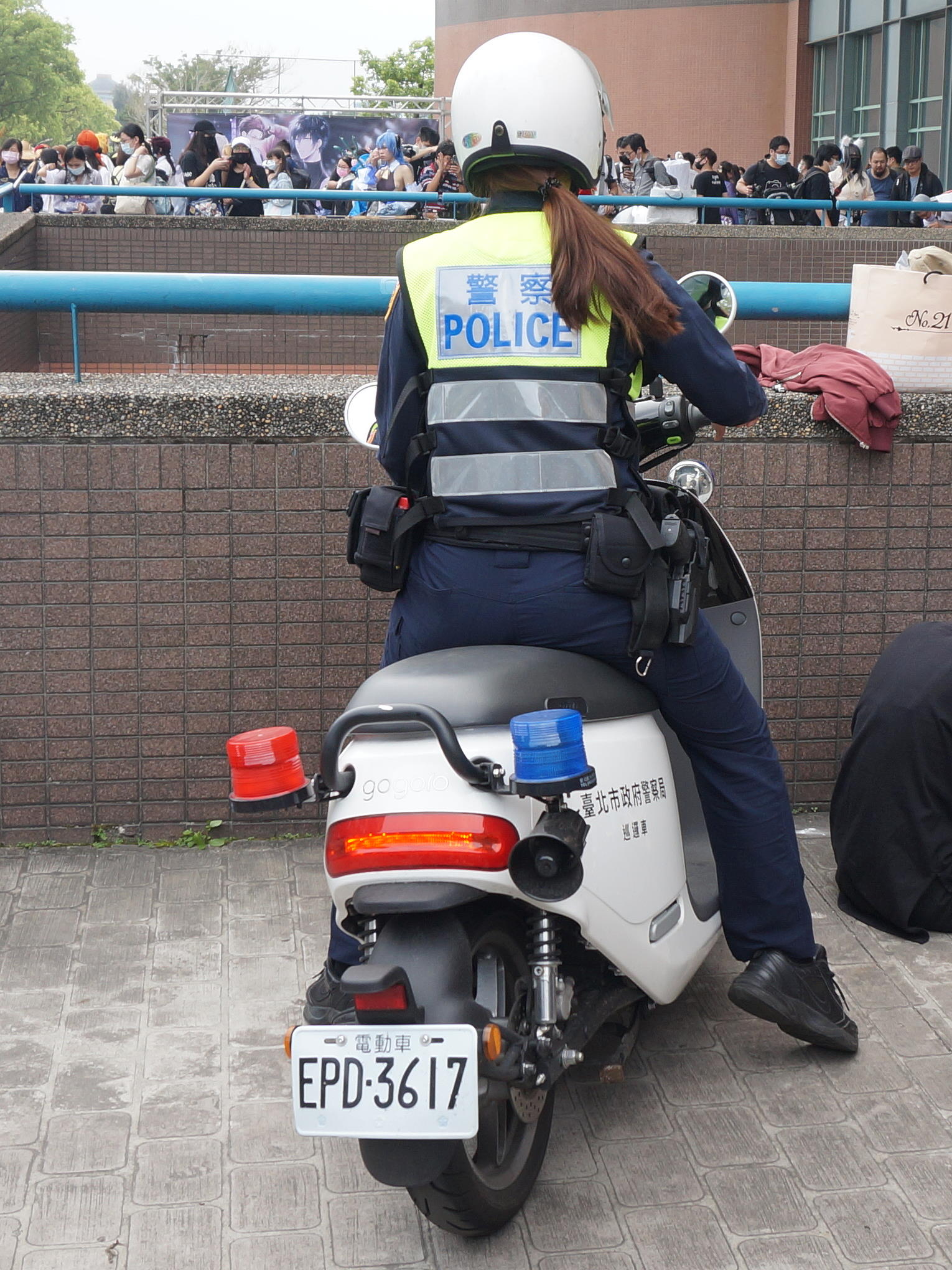
A police officer in Taiwan wears a white motorcycle helmet in conjunction with a high-visibility vest. According to a 2004 study, the wearing of reflective or fluorescent clothing correlated with a 37 percent lower risk of a rider sustaining a crash-related injury; likewise, white helmets demonstrated a 24 percent reduction.

The Hurt Report in the United States found that very few motorcyclists involved in collisions wore high-visibility clothing, and that just over half of the collisions studied, nearly two-thirds of those involving another vehicle, were due to the motorist unintentionally violating the motorcyclist's right of way. "This dominant culpability of the driver of the other vehicle... emphasizes the special need for high contrast conspicuity for the motorcycle and rider."

A New Zealand case-control study found that the population attributable risks were 33% for wearing no reflective or fluorescent clothing; one third of motorbike accidents might have been prevented by wearing high-visibility clothing. Conspicuous behaviors, such as the wearing of high-visibility clothing, the use of headlights in the daytime, and the use of a white helmet, reduced the risk of a rider facing a collision.

=== Cyclists ===
Traffic risks to the cyclist are similar to those faced by motorcyclists, with the main differences being that cyclist speeds are typically lower, and the cyclist wears less protective gear. In a 2009 study, most UK cyclists and almost all motorists believed that high-visibility clothing would increase cyclists' visibility. Almost all drivers agreed that cyclists need to wear reflective clothing in low lighting environments, whereas less than three-quarters of cyclists (72%) agreed, and less than half claimed that they always did so.

A Cochrane Systematic Review of research evidence for the effectiveness of visibility aids (fluorescent and retroreflective clothing and equipment) was carried out by Kwan and Mapstone in 2006. The authors found 42 studies which collectively suggested that fluorescent clothing could increase the distance at which drivers could detect and then recognise cyclists in daylight conditions. The same review found evidence that retro-reflective materials worn by cyclists at night had a similar effect on driver perceptions. At that time there were no studies published that had actually demonstrated a reduction in collision crashes for bicyclists wearing fluorescent or retroreflective clothing whilst on public roads.

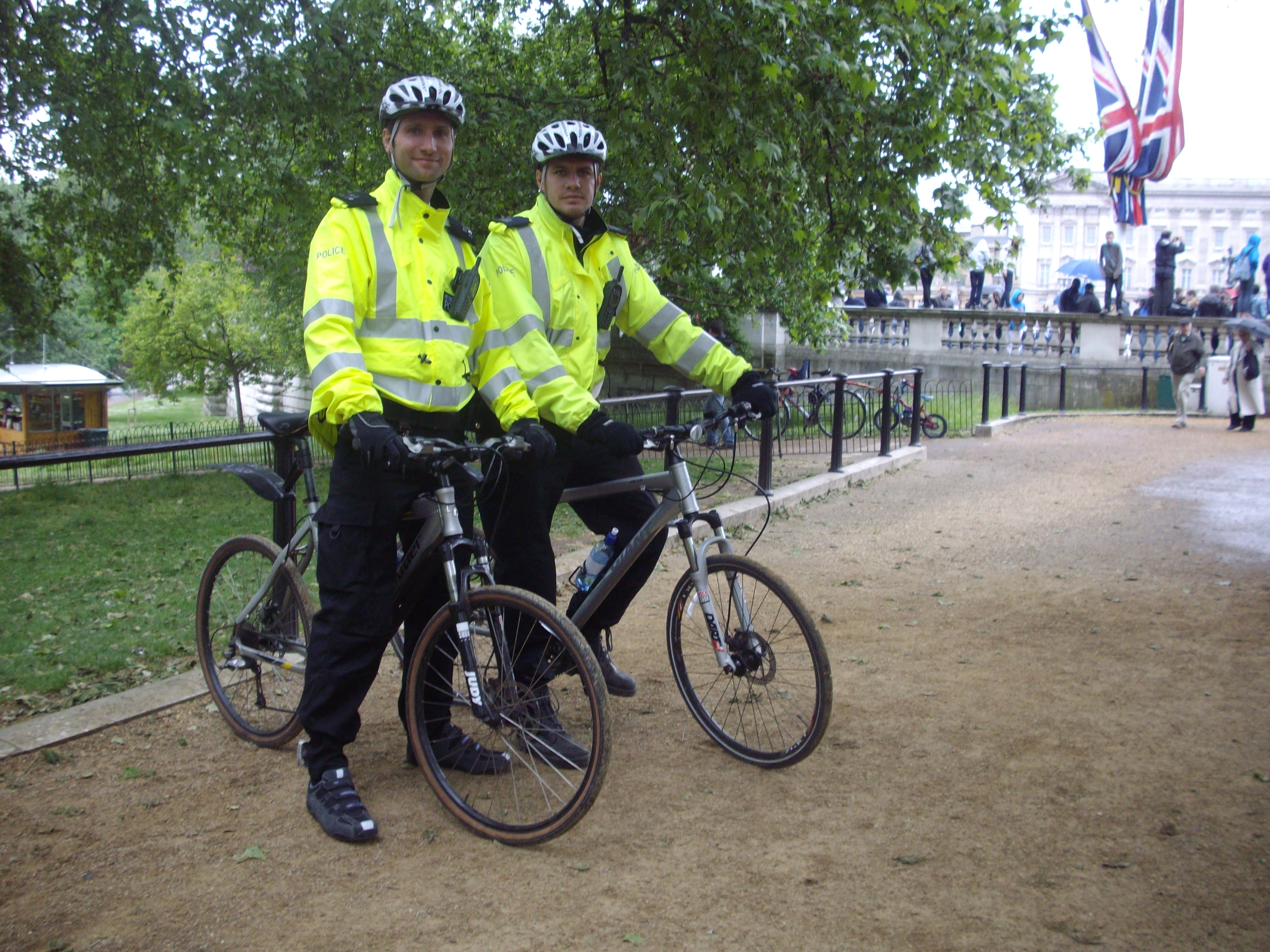
Bicycle-mounted police with high-visibility jackets.

A 2009 Australian study of drivers trying to see stationary cyclists on a closed circuit found that fluorescent vests (without retro-reflective stripes) were not a significant improvement on black clothing at night and that retro-reflective strips were more effective when attached to knees and ankles than on a more or less static jacket.

A 2012 British case-control study showed a non-significant increase in the odds of a crash for users of reflective conspicuity aids whilst cycling. In 2014, a further case-control study conducted in Canada reported a decrease in the odds of a collision with a motor vehicle when wearing 'light' coloured (not specifically fluorescent) clothing in daylight but an increase in the odds of a collision for cyclists using fluorescent clothing (and lights) at night. The number of conspicuity aids used was positively associated with an increase in collision crash odds but a non-significant reduction in the likelihood of hospitalisation.

A randomized controlled trial was conducted in Denmark between 2012 and 2013. The study collected data from 6793 regular cyclists for a year. The results suggest that conspicuity enhancing jackets can reduce by 47% the risk of collisions with other road users that cause injury and 55% for those collisions involving a motor vehicle. The effect of the intervention was higher in winter compared to summer (56% vs 39%), in daylight (51% vs the overall effect 47%) and for those participants who reported 'high' use of the jackets vs 'low' use (60% vs 33%). The study was based on participants self-reporting data, and there was evidence of response bias, which the authors attempt to correct for, reducing the 47% figure to 38%.

Since April 2013, New York City regulations require commercial cyclists, such as restaurant delivery persons or bike messengers, to wear high visibility clothing while riding.

=== Rail workers in the United Kingdom ===
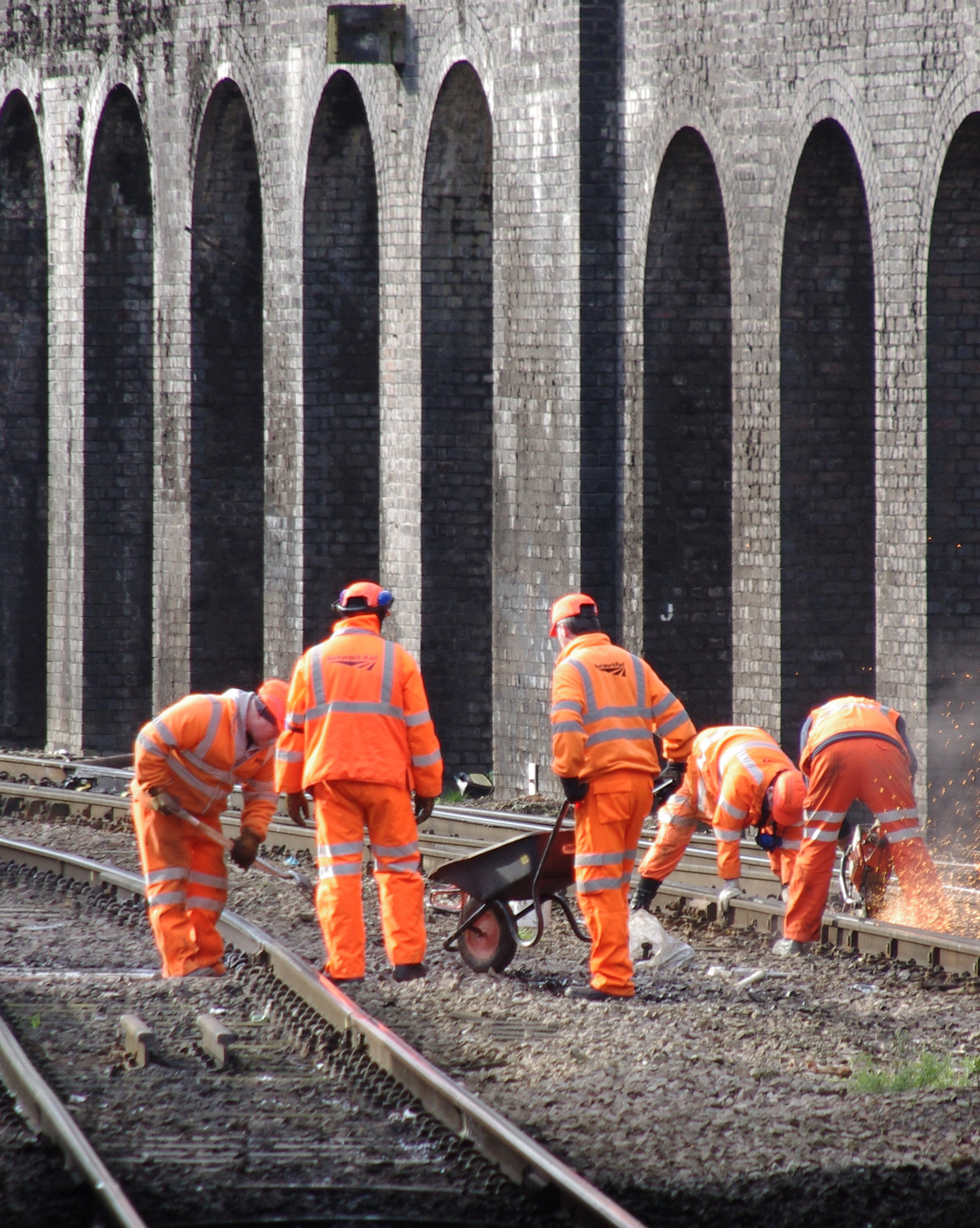
Network Rail staff working in RIS-3279-TOM compliant high-visibility clothing on track renewals just south of Leicester railway station

Experimental use of high-visibility clothing began in 1964 on the Scottish Region of British Railways. Fluorescent orange jackets, known as "fire-flies", were issued to track workers on the Pollokshields to Eglinton Street electrified section in Glasgow; they were later tried in other areas, such as Edinburgh, Aberdeen and Inverness. Train drivers operating in these areas were asked their opinion as to the effectiveness of the jackets. Following trials, high-visibility clothing was issued to engineering and other staff working on the electrified lines of the London Midland Region of British Railways in 1965. It was thought to be more important due to the higher speeds of the newly electrified West Coast Main Line route from London Euston to Birmingham, Manchester and Liverpool. The first version was worn as a jerkin and was "visible at ... half a mile in normal weather conditions".

Since then, features of high-visibility clothing such as the EN510 quick release standard and the EN471 and its successor EN ISO 20471:2013 high visibility standards, have improved the effectiveness and contributed to improved safety for rail workers and other staff. The specifications for Rail Industry Standard RIS-3279-TOM (fluorescent orange) high-visibility clothing suitable for use on railways in the United Kingdom are published by the Rail Safety and Standards Board.

== Standards ==
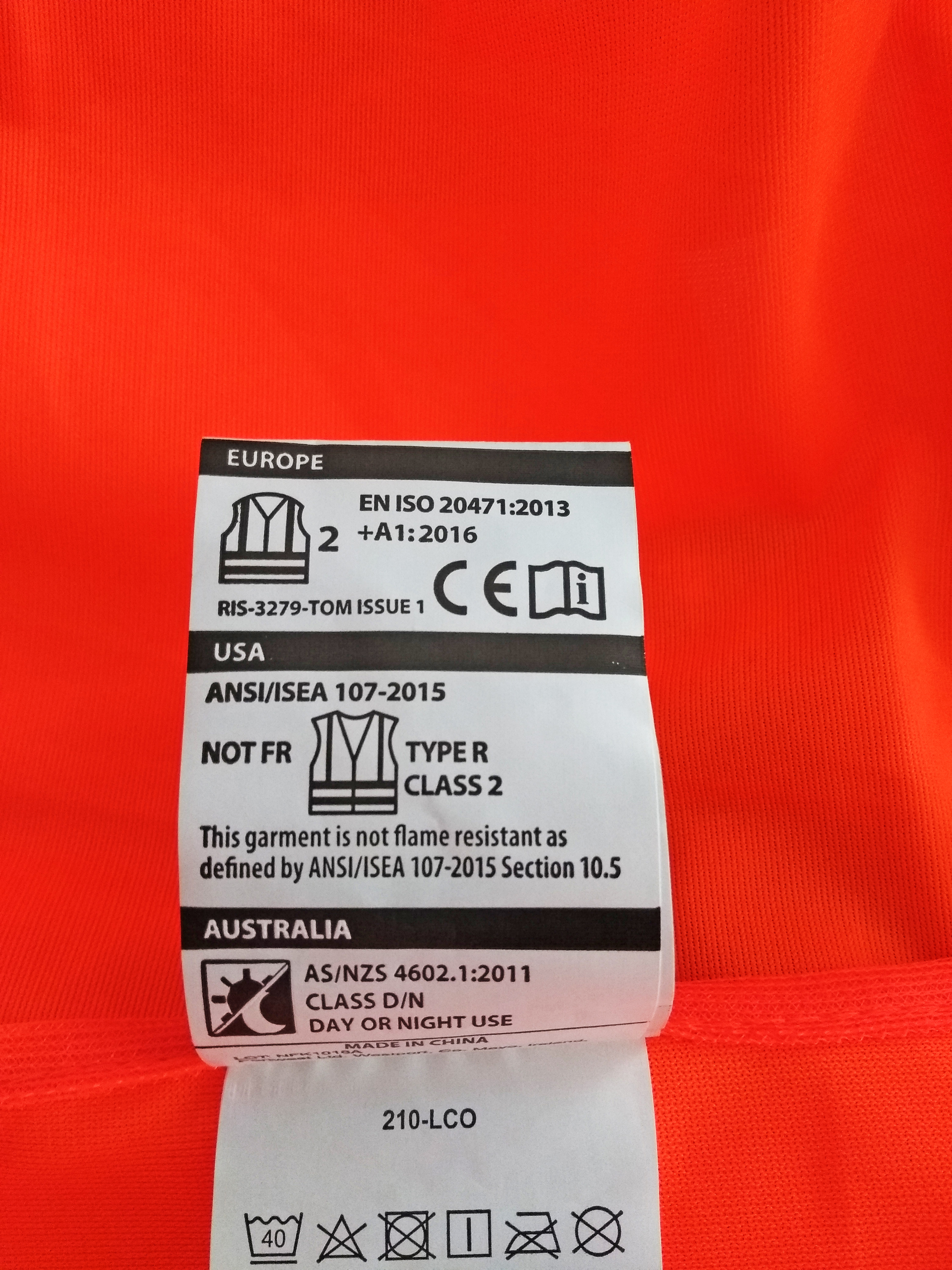
High-visibility clothing standards markings in a fluorescent orange coloured vest: EN ISO 20471:2013 (Europe/ISO) RIS-3279-TOM (UK Rail Industry Standard) ANSI/ISEA 107-2015 (USA) AS/NZS 4602.1:2011 (Australia)

=== India ===
The latest Indian standards for High Visibility Warning Clothes - Specification is IS 15809 : 2017.

=== ANSI/ISEA ===
The American National Standards Institute published standard 107 for high-visibility clothing in 1999. The standard defines three classes of successively more-visible garments, to protect workers exposed to successively higher levels of risk from motor vehicles and heavy equipment. The International Safety Equipment Association developed the standard, with revisions in 2004, 2010, 2015, and 2020.

The 207 standard has different requirements for fluorescent background material, specifically allowing for a shorter design that allows equipment belt access. It also includes many optional features, such as a 5-point breakaway design for easy removal, panels readily identifying the wearer as an emergency responder, and radio and badge holders.

=== Regulation (EU) 2016/425 ===
A European Union directive which covers high-visibility clothing.

=== North American hunting regulations ===
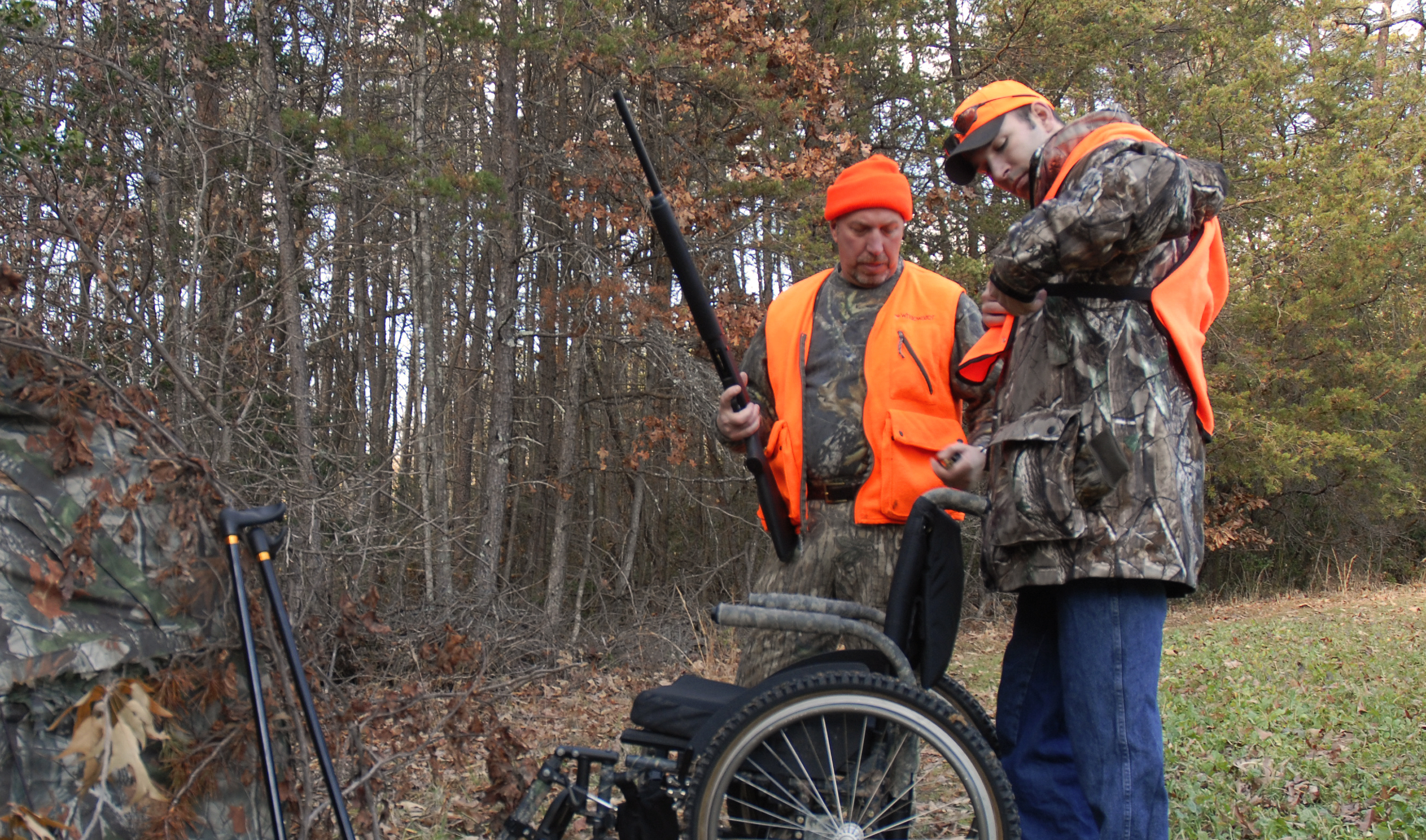
Deer hunters wearing blaze orange for identification as humans, not game animals

Hunting laws in each state or province may require hunters to wear designated garments in blaze orange to prevent misidentification of humans as game animals, and resulting shooting accidents. The required total visible area and times of use vary by jurisdiction and by the type of hunting in the area. Hunting clothes are available in blaze orange camouflage, where the bright orange color is plainly visible to human eyes, but the shape of the hunter is broken up by irregular patterns to prevent identification as a threat by game animals such as deer, who cannot see the color. Some jurisdictions also allow the use of a "blaze pink," a color that proponents argue is both more visible to humans and less visible to game animals.

=== ISO 20471 ===
The International Organization for Standardization published standard ISO 20471 for high-visibility clothing in 2013.

=== Australia ===
Australian/New Zealand Standard - AS/NZS 4602.1:2024 High visibility safety garments Garments for high risk applications from Standards Australia.

Safe Work Australia - general Personal Protective Equipment guide including references to high visibility clothing.

Class D workwear is suited to daytime use in Australia.

=== Canada ===
Canadian Standards: Z96-15 - High-visibility safety apparel

Canadian Center for Occupational Health and safety (CCOHS): Guide High-Visibility Safety Apparel: "Requirements for high-visibility safety clothing for Canadian workers are found in the CSA Standard Z96-15 High-Visibility Safety Apparel".

== Gallery ==
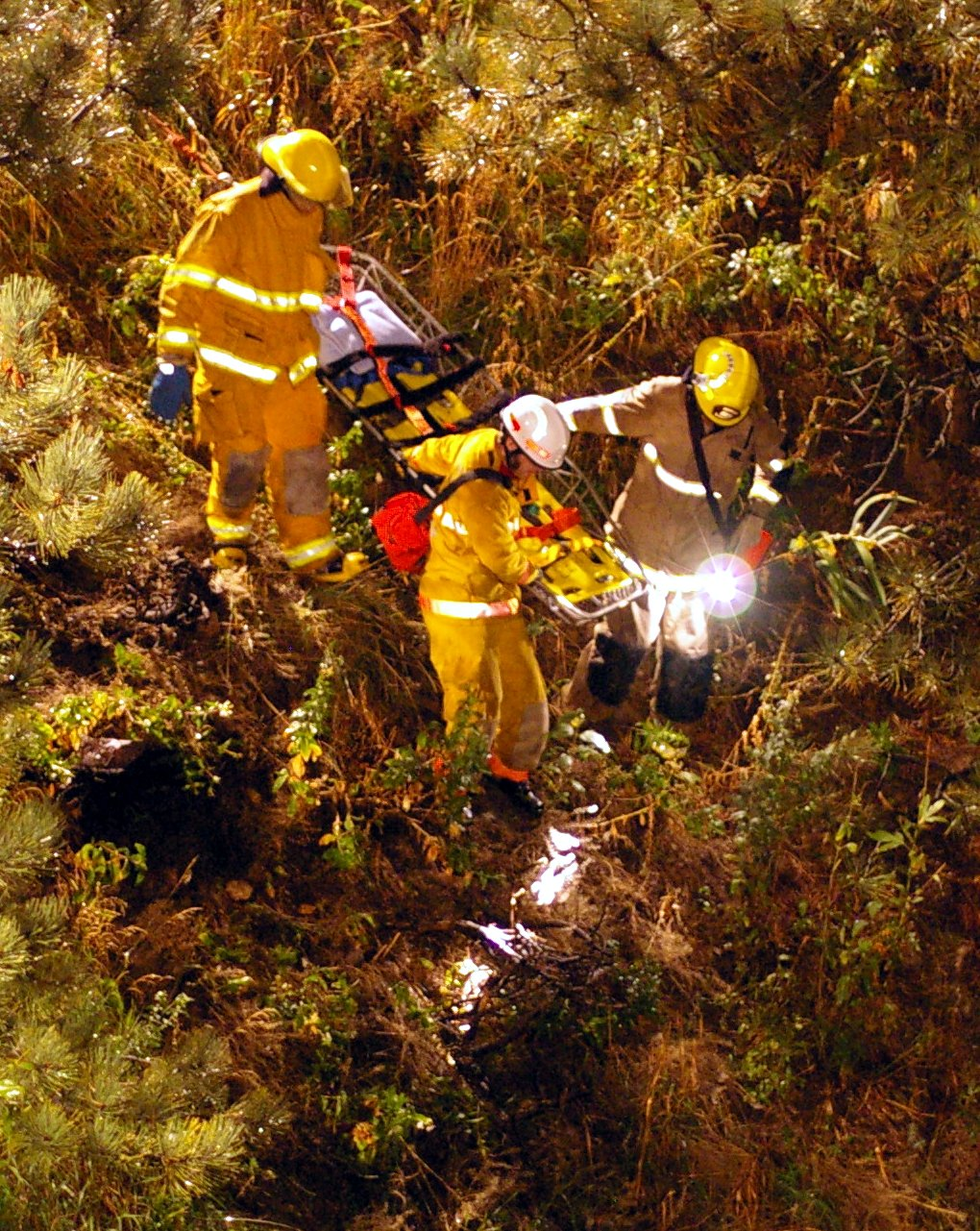
Firefighters wearing coats with high-visibility strips

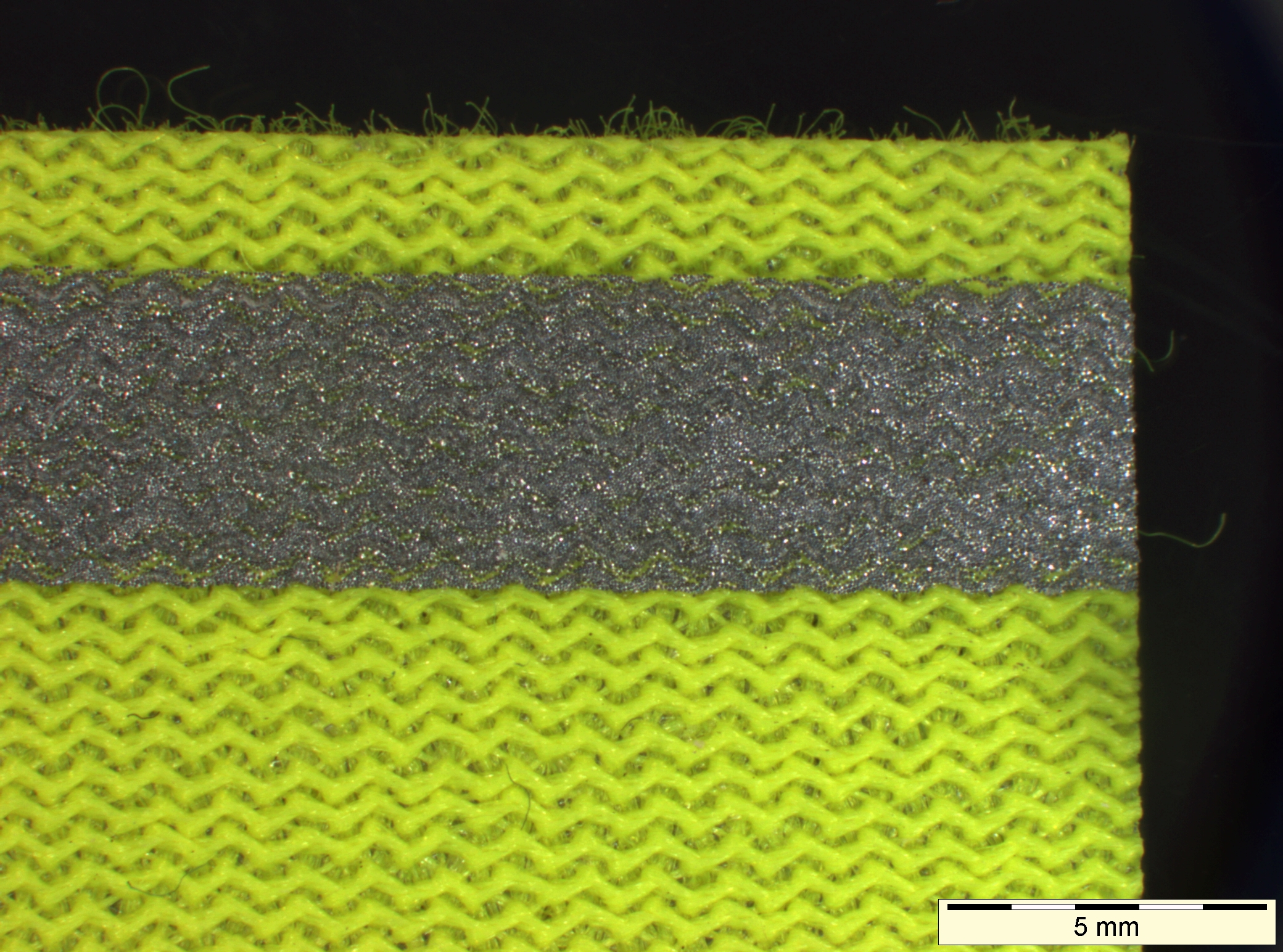
Retroreflective material in light microscope, magnification 3.5 ×

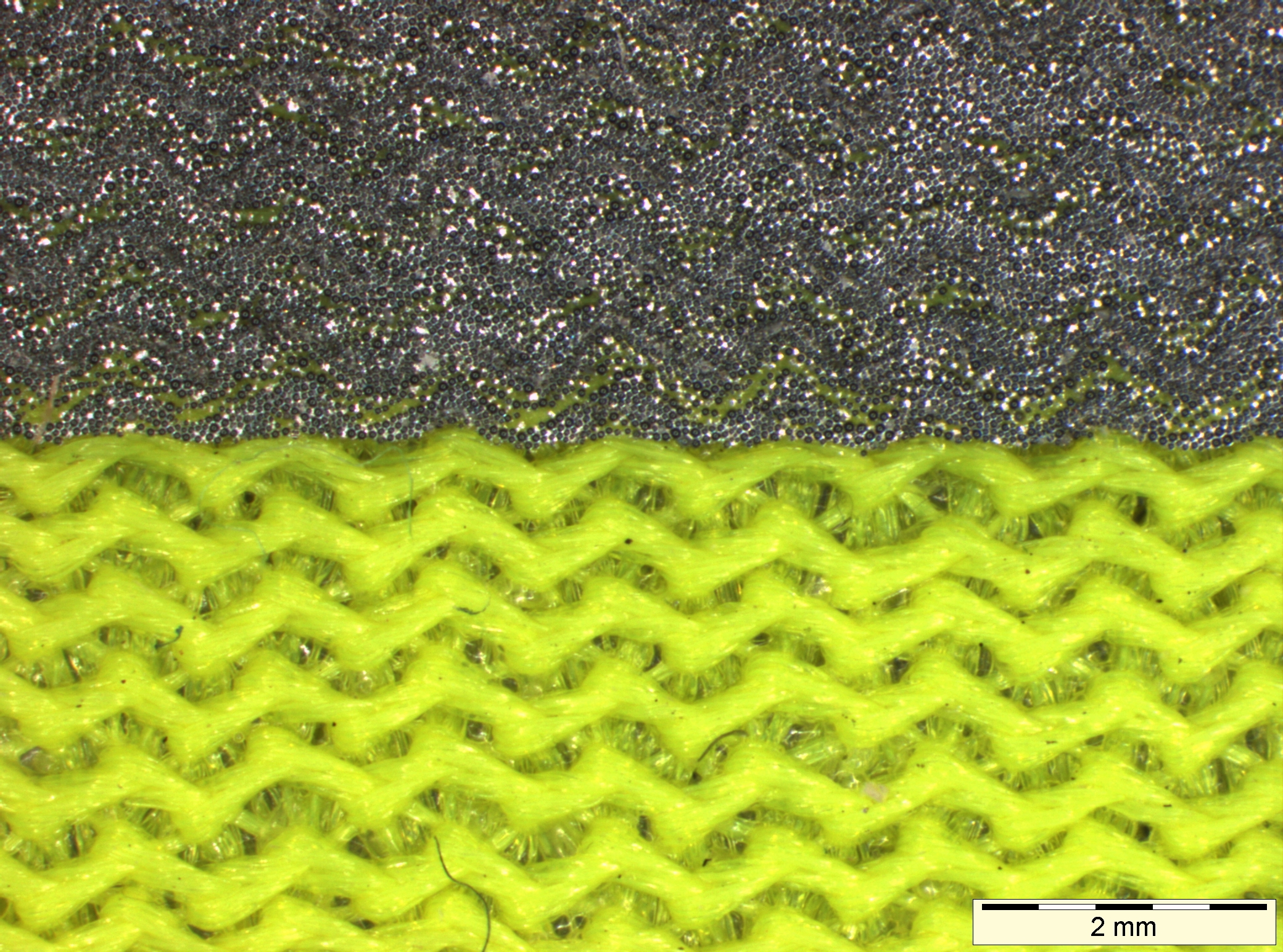
Retroreflective material in light microscope, magnification 8 ×

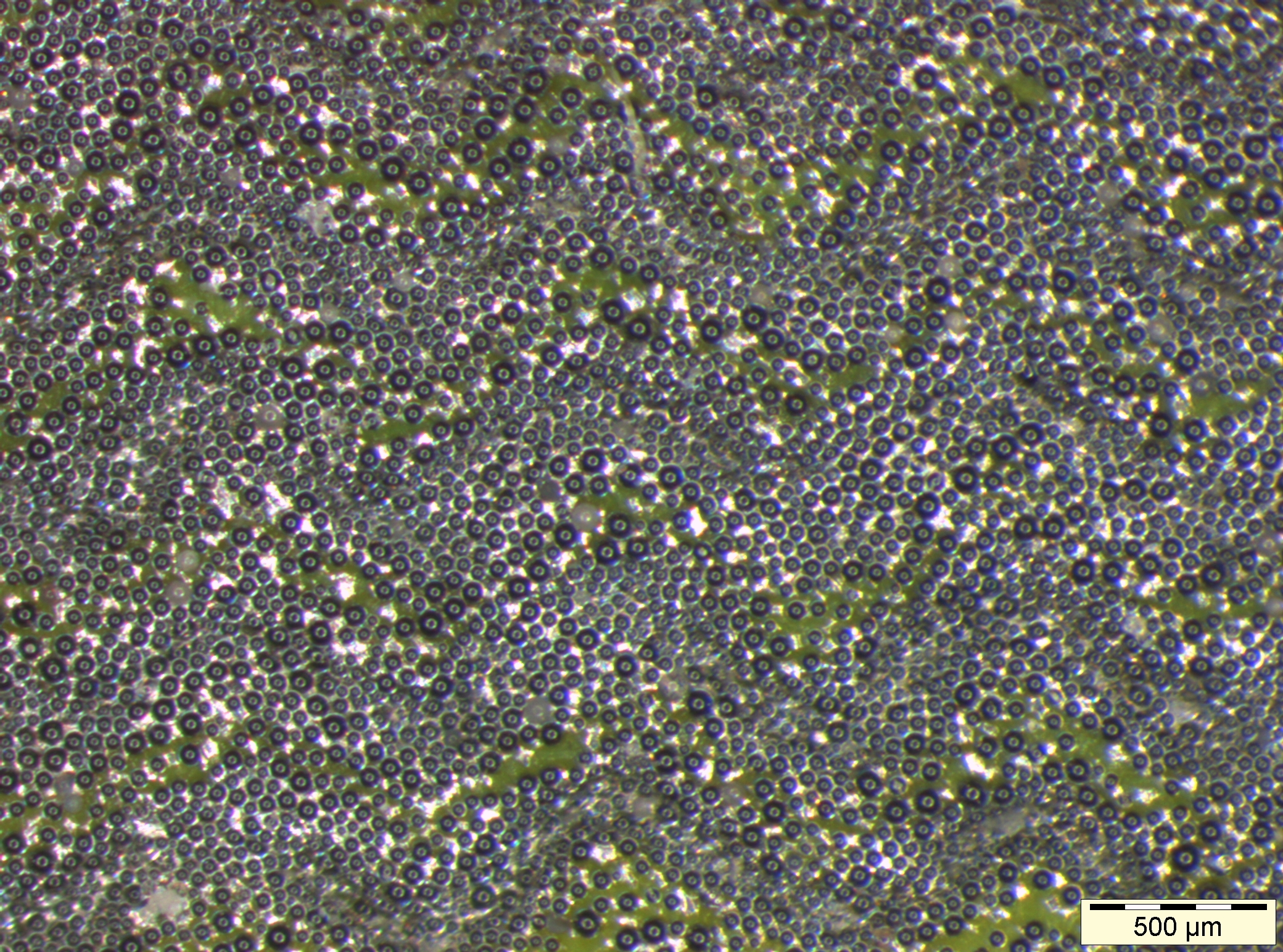
Retroreflective material in light microscope, magnification 20 ×

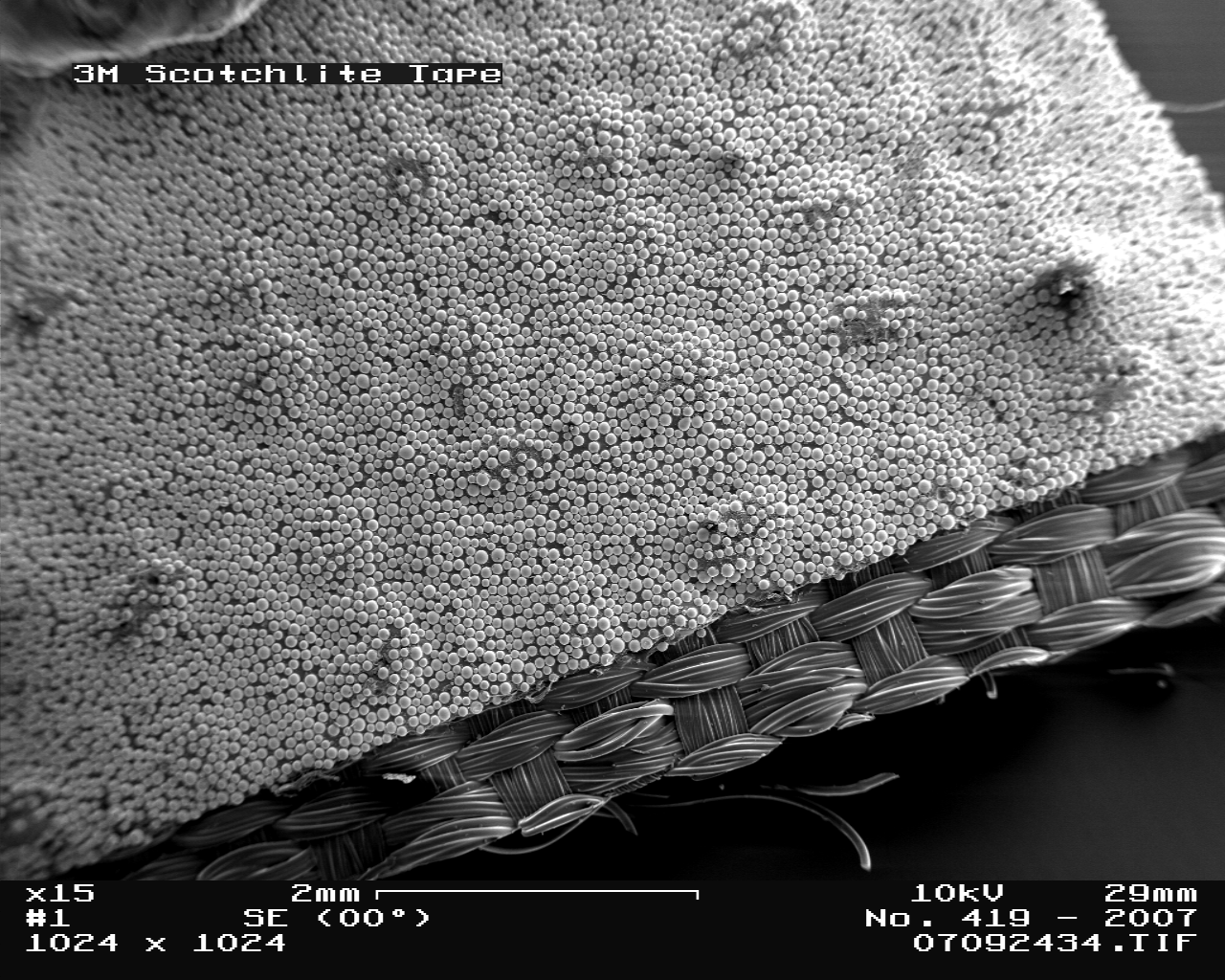
Retroreflective material in Scanning Electron Microscope, magnification 15 ×

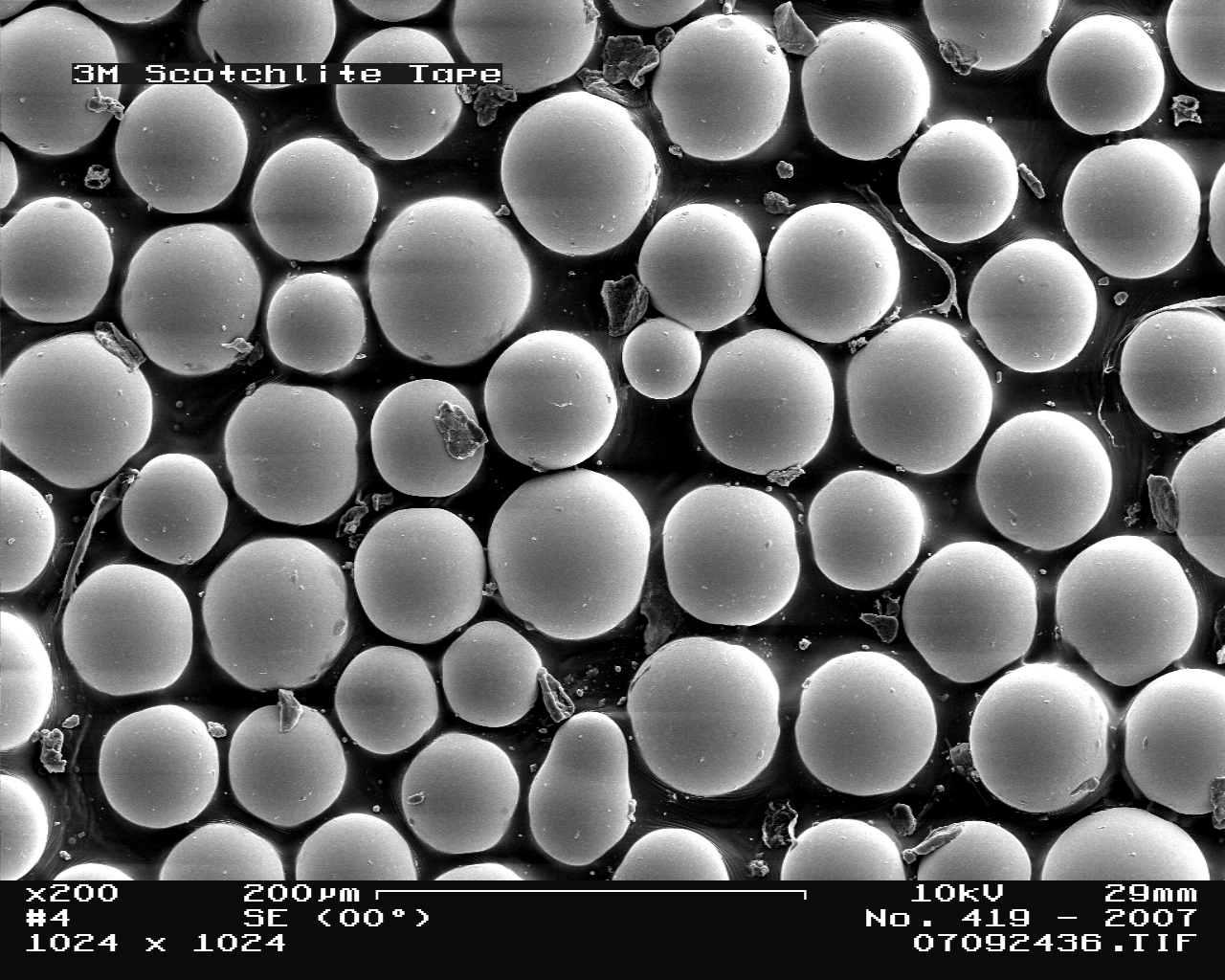
Retroreflective material in Scanning Electron Microscope, magnification 200 ×

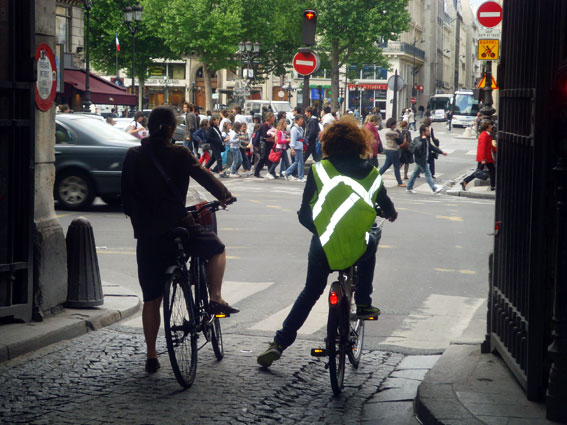
Reflective bag as used during the day in a dark area (illuminated by camera flash)

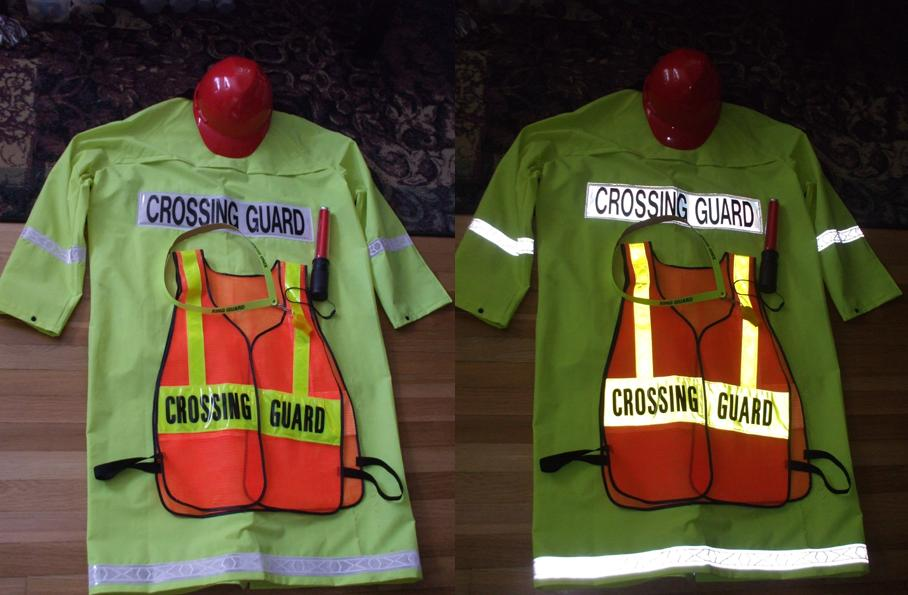
Photos of crossing guard clothing in normal light, and reflecting a point source of light.

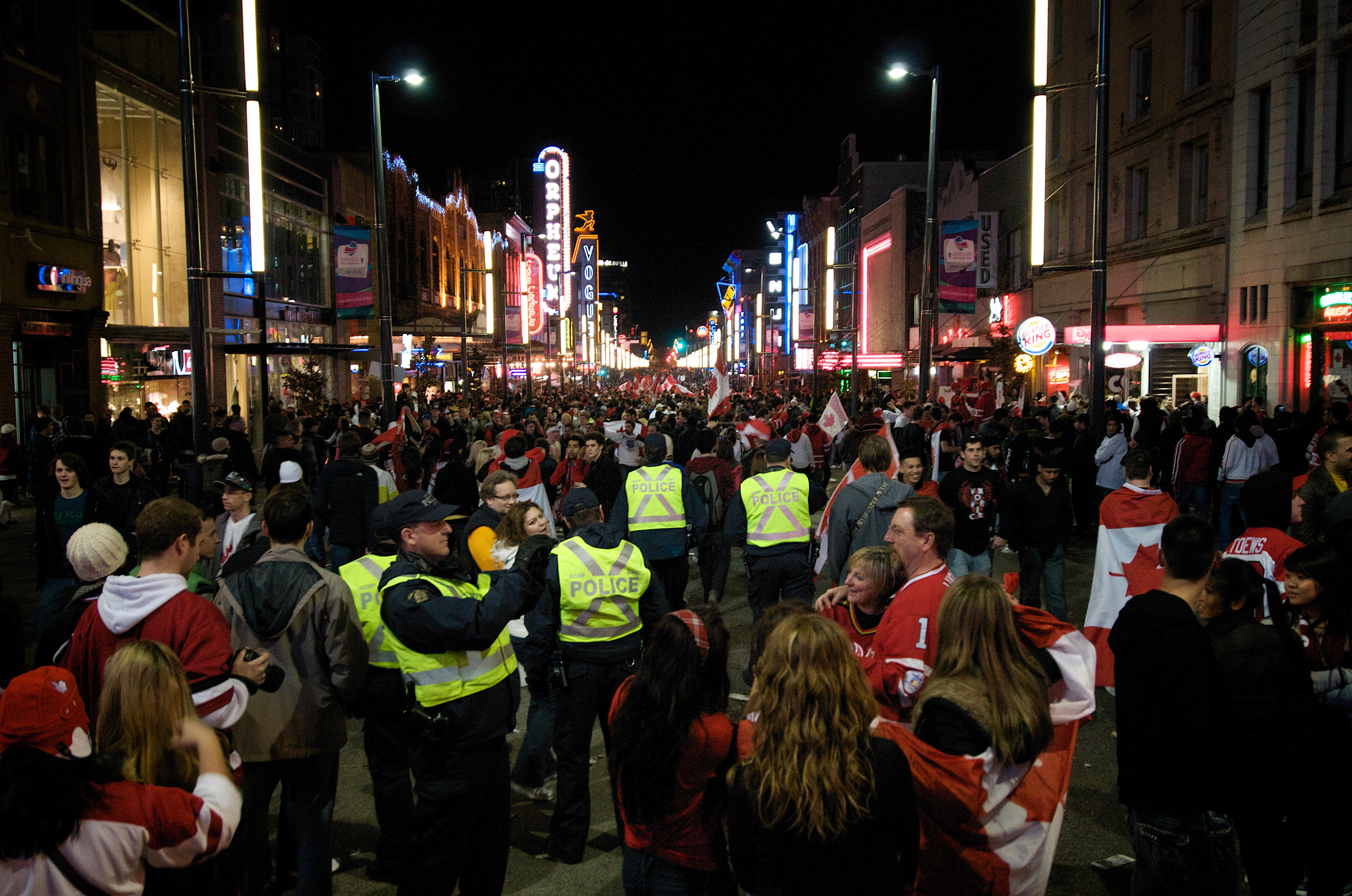
RCMP officers wearing reflective vests in Downtown Vancouver

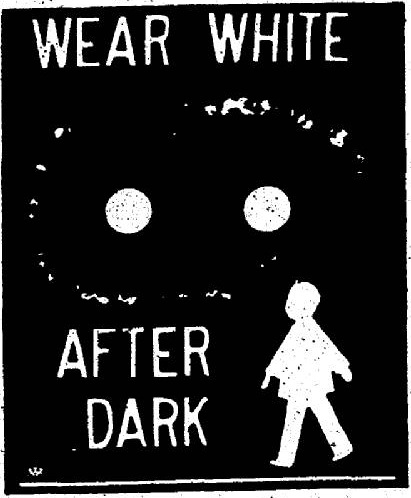
A 1979 public service advertisement from a Wisconsin newspaper

== See also ==
- Safety yellow
- Chartreuse yellow (also called neon yellow)
- Display (zoology) – High-visibility in nature
- Retroglo
- Retroreflector
- Retroreflective sheeting
- Robotic tech vest
- Safety orange
- Yellow vests movement
