= School buses by country =

Buses play a key role in student transport by transporting students to and from school. They often have a high seating capacity and a high degree of safety compared to other modes of transportation. The use of buses in student transport varies worldwide, and may take the form of

- the use of public transportation by students,
- transit buses set aside to transport students, or
- purpose-built school buses owned and operated by school systems or contractors.

Yellow school buses are most commonly associated with North America, where federal and state/provincial regulations have influenced their design characteristics, including its yellow color. When loading or unloading students, yellow school buses are given traffic priority. Their red warning lights and stop signs allow them to stop traffic.

== Asia ==
=== China ===
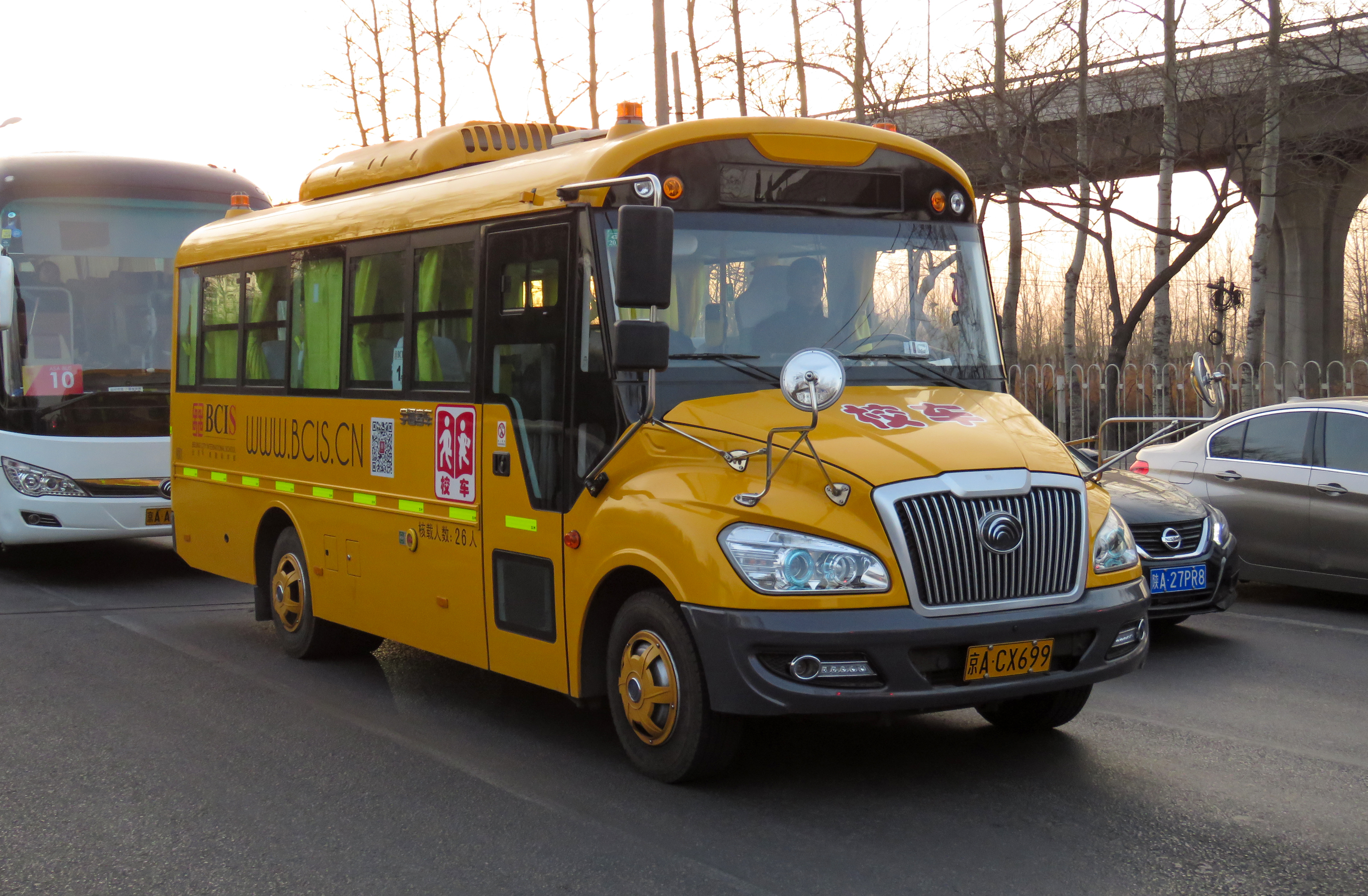
A Yutong school bus produced with an American-style cowled chassis

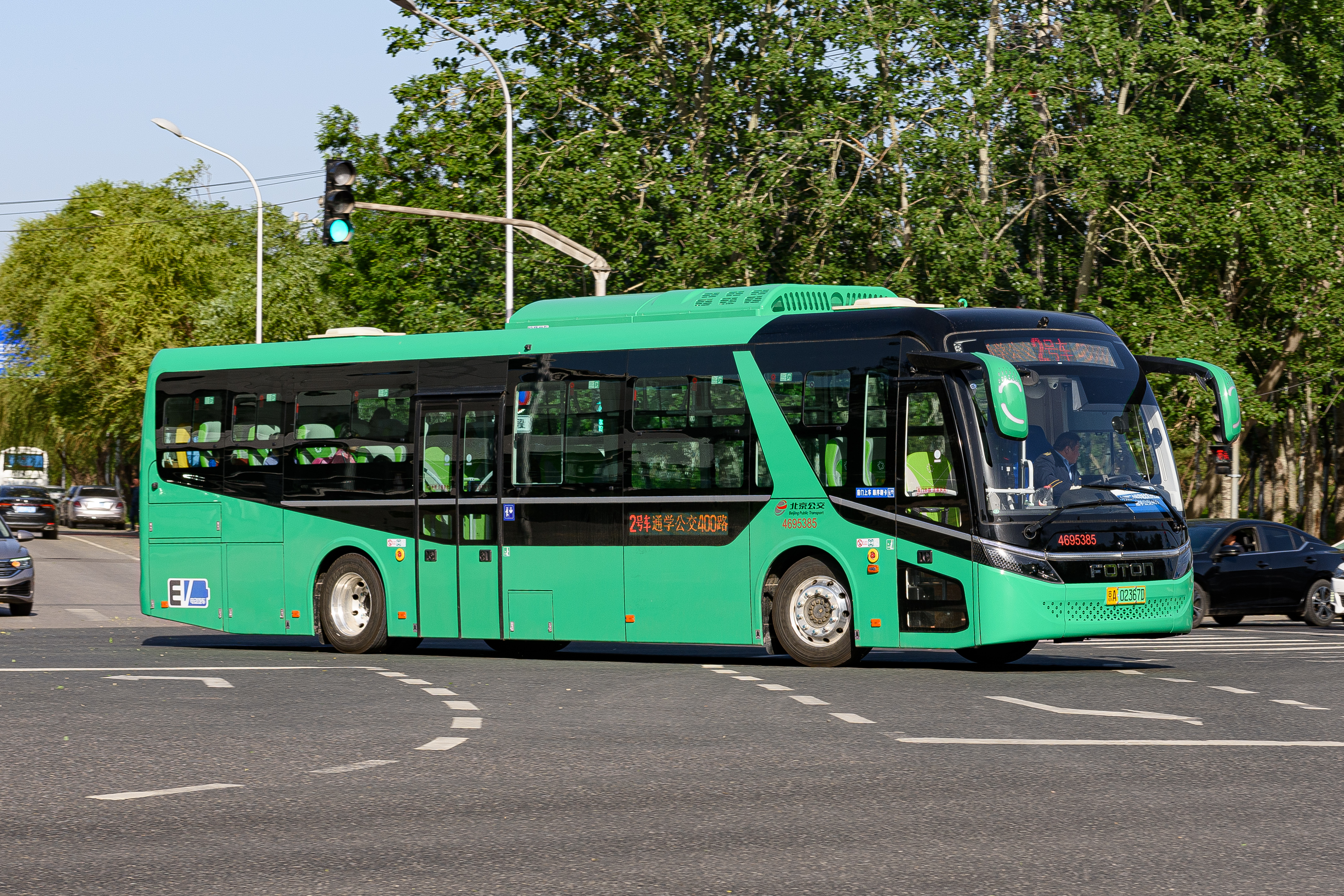
Beijing Public Transport operates school bus routes since 2023

In China, purpose-built vehicles for transporting schoolchildren are not commonly used. The earliest professional school bus in China appeared in October 2008. Compared with many developed countries, Chinese schools have a relatively short history of providing transportation services. It was not until 1990 that the first private schools began to offer bus services.

Due to a lack of buses, it is common for buses to be overloaded with schoolchildren. According to a 2011 article by Beijing Evening News, there are around 90 million students in China who need to ride school buses, which amounts to requiring over 1 million legally safe school buses. However, in 2010, the number of safe school buses just eclipsed 10,000, far below the recommended threshold. Consequently, accidents happen frequently, and 18,000 children die from traffic accidents every year. Furthermore, legally safe school buses that are manufactured in China are largely exported and rarely seen in China, further contributing to a lack of supply of safe school buses.

The frequency of school bus-involved traffic accidents has raised concerns throughout China. In 2011, 41 primary and middle school students were killed in school bus accidents, including a collision between a kindergarten bus and a coal van in Gansu province. The nine-seat minibus was carrying 64 people: the driver, a teacher, and 62 children. Both adults and 19 children were killed, and all surviving 43 students were injured. Following this, 15 children were killed when a school bus overturned into a ditch in Jiangsu province. In a third incident, two schoolchildren were killed and 20 injured when a carriage carrying students collided with a truck in Yunnan province. Three days later, in Yunnan province, five junior high school students were killed when a bus fell off a cliff.

==== Legislation ====
On September 1, 2007, the national standards committee issued a national standardization amendment titled "Motor Vehicle Operation Safety Technical Conditions". China began to implement the school bus operation mandatory standards. The same day, the Ministry of Education, the Ministry of Public Security, the Ministry of Justice, and ten other committees jointly issued the implementation of the "Primary and Secondary School Students Kindergarten Safety Management Office Law". Between September 1, 2007, and September 31, 2010, the Ministry of Public Security, in accordance with the Motor Vehicle Operation Safety Technical Conditions amendment, carried out school bus operations in various areas of the country. The social demand of school buses has attracted attention from all levels of government. The related management departments have been in the process of researching and discussing the most feasible ways to develop school bus industrialization in China.

In the twelfth Chinese five-year plan (2011–2015), the State Administration of Work Safety stressed the need to establish and improve the legal and safety management systems of school buses, clarify the right of way for school buses, strengthen the supervision of school buses, and ensure the safety of school buses. Each school bus must have satellite positioning and speed-limit devices installed.

The General Administration of Quality Supervision, Inspection and Quarantine has released the following safety guidelines for school buses:

1. School bus appearance: School buses are uniformly marked with eye-catching colors (e.g. yellow) and can be equipped with warning lights and sirens.
2. Inside the school bus: School bus safety regulations are higher than ordinary vehicles (e.g. anti-collision). GPS and real-time monitoring systems of the vehicle's running routes and speed are to be installed. A speed limiter should also be implemented to prevent speeding. The upper and lower doors are to be equipped with cameras to monitor personnel in real time. Buses are to be equipped with emergency hammers.
3. Crew: Drivers must have professional licenses and conduct regular spot checks. If there are issues, including driving violations, they should be corrected in a timely manner. The organization of training is mandated, and repeat offenders should be disqualified from driving school buses. Vehicles should be strictly restricted and one or more teachers should be assigned to maintain order.
4. Right of way: The school bus has the same right of way as a conventional bus. In case of emergency, the use of lights and alarms is required.

==== Models ====
Some Chinese bus manufacturers have developed school bus models to be purchased by Chinese schools. Yutong, for example, designed the ZK6100DA model, which was described as a "big-nose school bus" with a "classic western-style appearance" and "the highest safety rating of all school bus products in China" in a 2011 China Daily article. FAW Bus and Coach has developed a similar model, the CA6750, which can hold 37 students. In addition to large school buses, minibuses are produced by various manufacturers. Chengdu Automobile Factory produces the "Chendu School bus", and Maxus produces the "Maxus V80 School bus". The models can hold 24 and 16 students, respectively.

In February 2012, the potential of American-imported school buses was explored as several American manufacturers, including Blue Bird Corporation and Navistar International, displayed buses at the Beijing International School Bus Exhibition.

==== Hong Kong ====
A "nanny van" is a special type of school bus in Hong Kong.

In Hong Kong, younger students are transported between their homes and schools by "nanny vans". These vehicles are typically van-based and are smaller than a minibus. When nanny vans originated, they were regulated primarily by the schools and the van drivers. Today, in the interest of safety, nanny vans are government-regulated vehicles that run on fixed routes, and most of schools use coaches for school bus instead of nanny vans.

=== Japan ===
==== Usages ====
In Japan, the usage rate of school buses is relatively low. According to a 2008 survey by the Ministry of Education, Culture, Sports, Science and Technology (MEXT), school buses had been introduced in 62.7% of municipalities nationwide (meaning at least one school within each of those municipalities, not 62.7% of all schools in Japan). At that time, approximately 180,000 elementary and junior high school students, or about 1.7% of the total, were using school buses.

The survey found that the proportion of municipalities implementing school buses was higher in prefectures with low population density, such as Niigata and Yamagata, and lower in major metropolitan areas like Tokyo and Kanagawa. It was also estimated that many of the 180,000 students using school buses were attending designated schools (へき地等指定学校) in depopulated or remote areas. In such regions, the distance between students’ homes and their schools is often considerable, and in mountainous areas, the roads can be particularly steep or difficult. In northern regions such as Hokkaido, snowfall during the winter can make walking to school extremely difficult.

As noted above, school bus usage in elementary and junior high schools is generally low in Japan. Particularly in public schools, the vast majority of students walk to school. Private elementary and junior high schools are fewer in number and are often located farther from students’ homes, so students are more likely to use trains, public transit buses, or school buses (typically operated between the school and the nearest train station). In high school, both public and private, it becomes more common for students to commute by train, public transit bus, or bicycle rather than on foot, and many private high schools operate school buses. This trend also applies to universities. School buses are also relatively common at kindergartens and nursery schools.

In addition, school buses are sometimes operated by special needs schools (特別支援学校) for students requiring assistance with transportation, by international schools (such as Brazilian schools), and even by driving schools, fitness clubs, and cram schools.

As expected, school buses in Japan are generally off-limits to outsiders. However, some schools allow visitors to use the school bus from the nearest railway station when they have official reasons to visit the campus—such as for open campus events at universities or private high schools, school tours, cultural festivals, or entrance examinations.

In Japan, there is no standardized body color that identifies a school bus—such as the yellow in the United States—and their appearance is typically not very different from regular transit buses. However, some private kindergartens operate school buses customized with "cute" designs featuring anime characters or animals for promotional purposes.

==== Operations ====
School buses for public schools are operated by local governments, whereas those for private schools (including kindergartens) are operated by the respective school corporations.

In terms of actual operation, there are two main models: one is where the school or local authority owns and operates the bus directly as a legal private-use vehicle; the other involves outsourcing operations to bus or taxi companies, under licensing systems such as the General Chartered Passenger Motor Vehicle Transportation Business (一般貸切旅客自動車運送業) (chartered buses (貸切バス)), or the Designated Passenger Motor Vehicle Transportation Business (特定旅客自動車運送事業) (designated-use buses (特定バス)), as defined under Article 3 of the Road Transport Act (道路運送法). Originally, school bus operations were conducted exclusively under the designated-use system, but a revision to a law in 2014 made it legally possible to operate school buses using chartered buses as well.

In the case of privately owned school buses, the vehicles are maintained and managed by the school or local authority itself, and drivers are also directly employed (though sometimes dispatched from agencies). Since these are considered private-use vehicles, their license plates are white, and they can be operated with a Class 1 (private) large or medium vehicle license. However, some schools have internal employment rules requiring drivers to hold a Class 2 (professional) large vehicle license.

When operated under the form of designated-use transport, the vehicles are owned by a licensed bus company. However, the name of the contracting school is typically prominently displayed on the vehicle, while the name of the bus company is often shown only in a small font, usually in a corner of the vehicle body. The license plates in this case are green, indicating commercial-use vehicles (similar to those of public transit buses or sightseeing coaches), and the buses are classified as such. The drivers must hold a Class 2 large vehicle license. These buses are also allowed to use dedicated or priority bus lanes, just like standard transit buses.

In some cases, transit bus companies operate buses for students between nearby railway stations and schools. In such instances, fares are typically the same as regular transit buses, sometimes slightly discounted, or even free of charge. These buses are operated under the General Passenger Motor Vehicle Transportation Business (一般乗合旅客自動車運送事業) license (i.e., as regular transit buses) and are generally considered distinct from the school buses described earlier.

There are also hybrid or intermediate cases between regular transit buses and school buses. For example, Dokkyō Saitama Junior and Senior High School operates a regular paid transit bus service (by Asahi Motor), and during special events such as cultural festivals, entrance exams, or school tours, free charter buses are added as extra services. At Shūmei Yachiyo Junior and Senior High School, free school buses run during commuting hours, while during off-peak times, the same buses operate as part of the standard Keisei Bus Chiba Central transit network. The bus company Kokusai Jūō Kōtsū operates transit bus lines serving campuses such as Risshō University Kumagaya Campus and Tokyo University of Social Welfare Isesaki Campus, where students and faculty can ride for free by showing identification, effectively combining aspects of both transit buses and school buses.

At U.S. military bases in Japan, school buses are provided for the children of U.S. military personnel commuting to on-base schools. These buses resemble those in the United States, with yellow paint and English "STOP" signs mounted on the sides. The operation of these buses is confined to within the base premises and they are not used on public roads outside the base.

==== Regulations ====
According to Article 71-2-3 of the Road Traffic Act (道路交通法), drivers of other vehicles are required to reduce their speed to a crawl when passing a school or kindergarten bus that is in the process of picking up or dropping off passengers.

According to Article 18-9 of the Safety Regulations for Road Transport Vehicles (道路運送車両の保安基準), buses with a seating capacity of 11 or more that are exclusively used for transporting children to and from elementary schools, junior high schools, kindergartens, nursery schools, or special needs schools must display specific signs on the front, rear, and both sides of the vehicle.

Additionally, special safety regulations apply to vehicles exclusively used for transporting young children, regardless of seating capacity. These include:

- Prohibition of auxiliary (folding) seats (Article 22-6)
- Exemption from seatbelt requirements (Article 22-3)
- Requirement to provide an aisle (Article 23-2)
- Prohibition of standing passengers (Article 24)
- Requirement for a child-appropriate boarding door on the left side (Articles 24-2 and 24-6)
- Installation of an emergency exit (Article 26)
- Installation of a fire extinguisher (Article 47)

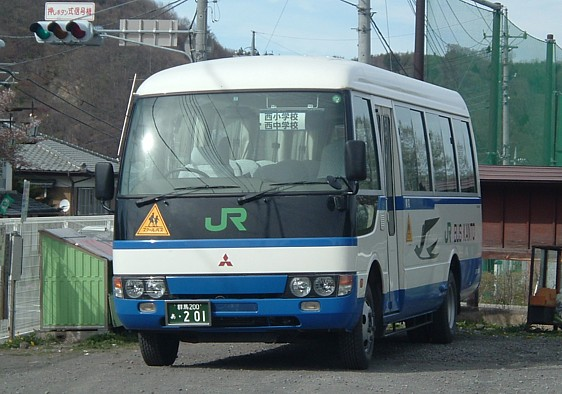
School bus operated by JR Bus Kantō, for Nishi Elementary School and Nishi Junior High School, Tsumagoi, Gunma.

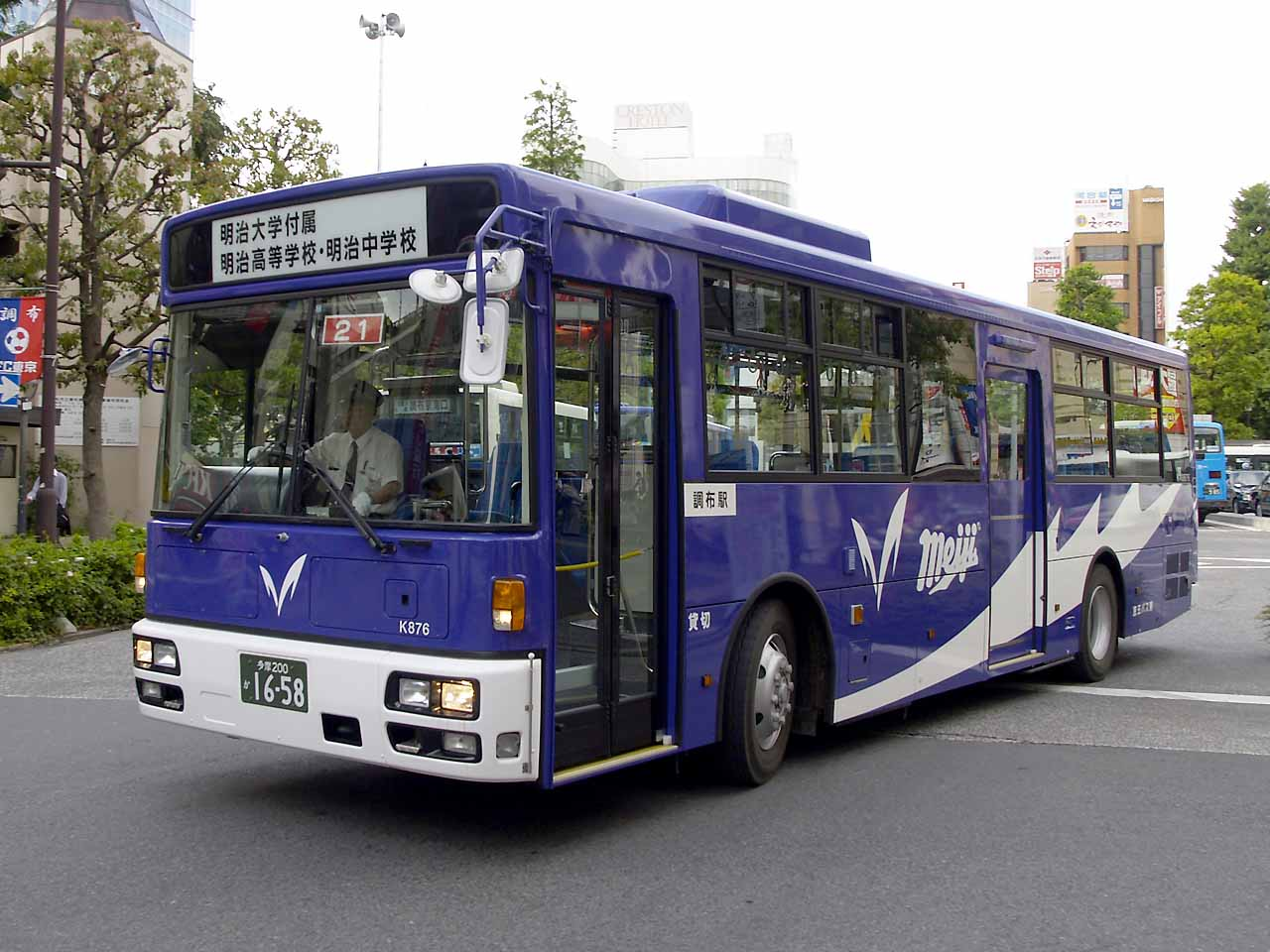
School bus operated by Keiō Bus, for Meiji University Meiji High School and Meiji Junior High School, Chōfu, Tokyo.

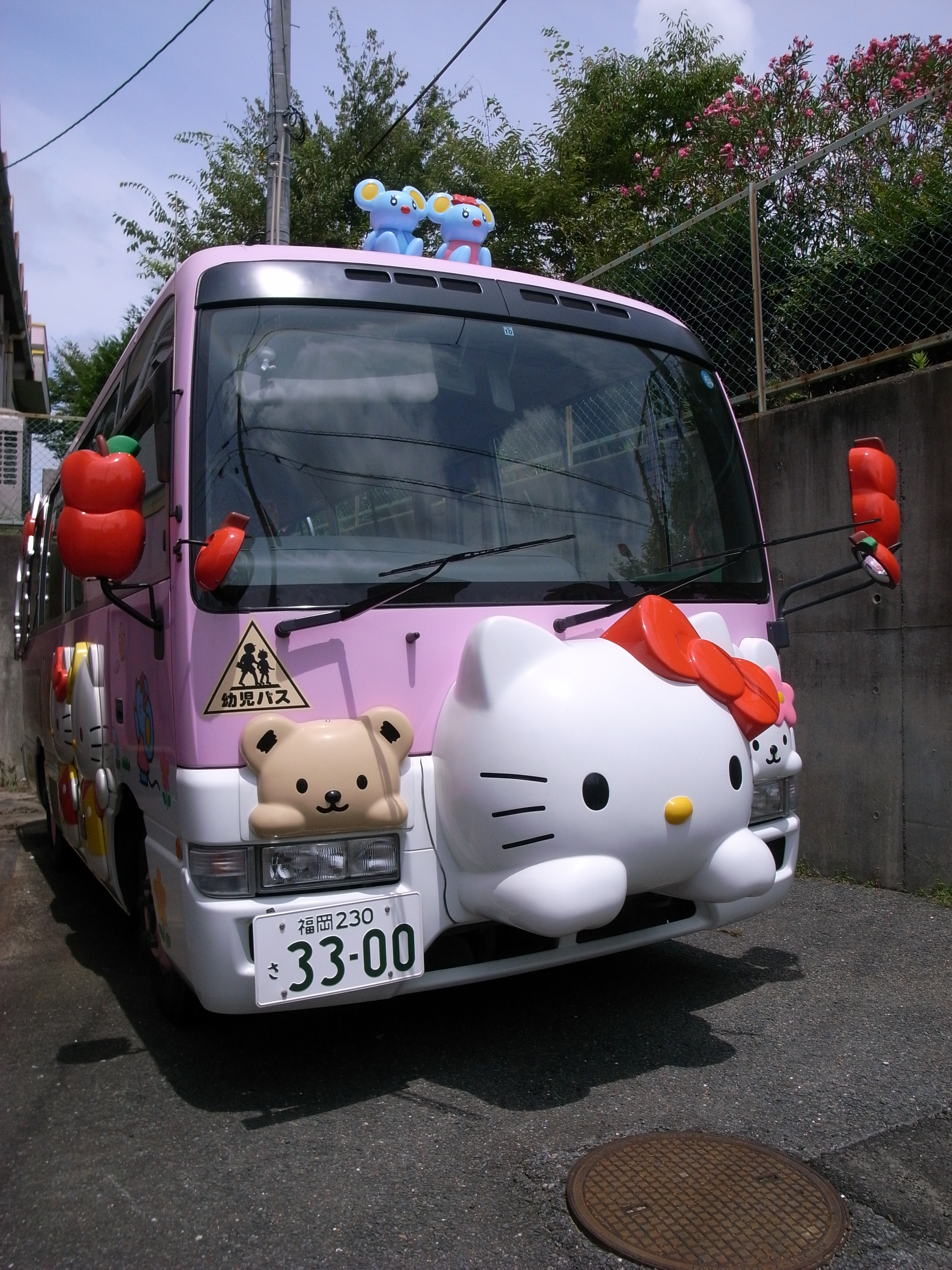
Hello Kitty faced kindergaten bus by Wakagidai Kindergaten, Fukutsu, Fukuoka.

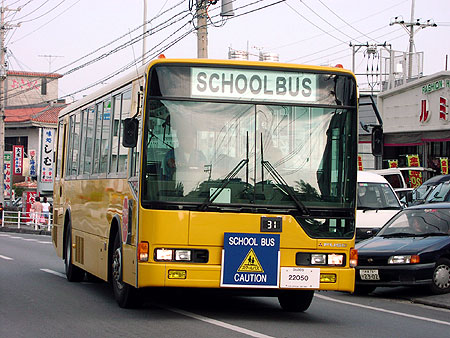
U.S. base school bus, Okinawa.

=== Philippines ===
School buses in the Philippines are called "School Service". Most vehicles used for such services are painted a bright yellow, with caution stripes painted on the front and rear, though a few schools may opt to paint their buses in the school's own colors instead.

Most vehicles used for such services are light vans like the Toyota Hiace, Nissan Urvan, and small trucks, like the Mitsubishi L300, which has a capacity of 15-17 people. School service trucks mostly use passenger boxes with windows (Referred to as an FB Body), which often have a rear door, and rarely a side door, while the vans are largely unmodified. Medium size minibuses like the Toyota Coaster, Hyundai County and Hyundai Aero Town, and full size coach buses like the Hyundai Universe and Kia Granbird, are rather uncommon, and are usually operated by larger, or more higher-end schools. Jeepneys may be used for the service, but are typically relegated towards provincial areas.

During the COVID-19 pandemic in the Philippines, the operators of the bus companies were forced to close their businesses. On August 22, 2022, the buses were allowed to operate again by the Land Transportation Franchising and Regulatory Board, which regulates land-based public transportation. They still continue to operate and they are returning to pre-pandemic service levels.

=== Singapore ===
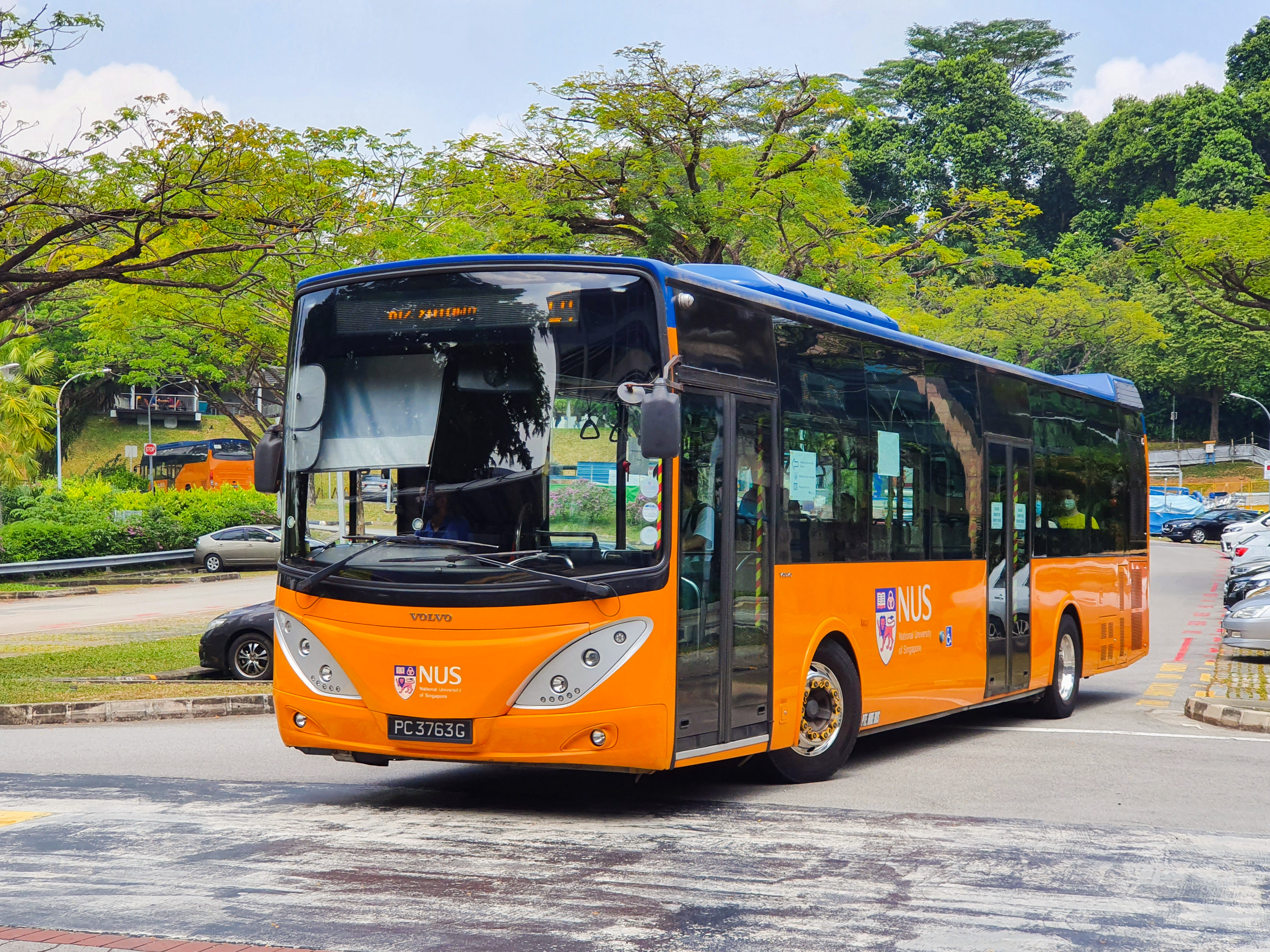
A shuttle bus at NUS, 2021

In Singapore, student transport by bus is usually provided by local scheduled public transport bus services, such as the 31, 72, 88, 179 and 199 services, as well as various train services. Dedicated bus services for school students are usually contracted out to local bus companies, using ordinary buses which are used for other purposes when not in use for school journeys. The Singaporean Ministry of Education has created the Information Notice Board for School Bus Services (IBSB) platform, on which different bus operators can submit bids for the opportunity to provide school bus services.

=== South Korea ===
South Korea attaches great importance to student traffic safety. Over the years, laws and regulations have specified the school bus and vehicle management rules for picking up students. The research and development of educational projects and facilities has gradually formed a student traffic safety management system.

==== Current status of Korean elementary and middle school cars ====
South Korea has a 12-year compulsory education system. Primary and secondary schools are compulsory. Most kindergartens and primary schools in Korea are private schools. Because schools are located near residential areas, most Korean students go to schools on foot. Therefore, people can often see a group of students walking to the school in the morning. Students who live further away from school uses public transportation like subway or bus. There are limited number of private schools who need school buses.

==== The status quo of Korean university bus ====
Korean university school buses are common, and almost every university has its own school bus. These school buses vary in color with yellow buses being rare and are distinguishable from other buses by a yellow school zone sign or a sign that reads "School Bus" on the top rear end of the bus. Private and public schools often have 'activity' style buses, sometimes in a color matching the 'school colours' although more commonly with just the name and logo of the school on the side and/or front of the bus. Moreover, these buses commonly also being used for normal scheduled routes as required. These school buses are generally convenient places from school stations to subway stations or some supermarkets or hospitals. The school bus has a fixed schedule. These buses are mainly designed to provide convenience to students from all over the world. Increasingly, jurisdictions are requiring new buses purchased for use on school routes to be fitted with seat belts and 'compartmentalisation' features, or even requiring students to use seat belts at all times.

==== Korean school bus style ====
The school buses in South Korea are basically directly converted from commercial vehicles. Among them are the modern Hyundai Starex and Staria, Kia Carnival, Ssangyong Korando Turismo, with the larger vehicles being Hyundai Universe, Kia Granbird, Daewoo FX and so on. These school buses are all painted in yellow and add with headlights. There are few internal changes. Schools with good economic conditions will prefer modern business vehicles as school buses. The car will be painted with a cartoon image that is fascinating. If the economic conditions are not very good, they will use the old models like Hyundai Grace and Kia Pregio, Ssangyong Istana. The Hyundai Starex is equipped with a 2.2-litre diesel engine and a 5-speed automatic transmission. Up to four row seats can be selected for a total of 12 seats.

==== Korea Road Traffic Law Policy ====
South Korea has strict requirements for school buses to ensure children are safe at home. According to the 2004 study of the Organisation for Economic Co-operation and Development, over the past 20 years, the number of children killed by its member states on the road has reached 100,000, and the death rate of children's traffic accidents is four times that of adults. Traffic accidents have become the leading cause of death among children. The countries with high death rates for children with traffic accidents are the United States, New Zealand, and South Korea, while the lower countries include Sweden, Italy, the United Kingdom, and Japan. In view of this situation, the Korean government made a comprehensive revision of the Road Traffic Law in 2006, further supplementing and improving the safety management of pre-school children and students commuting vehicles, applying for school bus, replacement, performance, marking, insurance, Detailed rules have been set for the driving rules, the obligations and responsibilities of the drivers.

In South Korea, the school bus that picks up and collects children's classes and schools has a protected status on the road and is legally guaranteed. The Korean Road Traffic Law stipulates that when a vehicle carrying a preschool child or student stops on the road, the driver of the car driving on the parking road or on the roadside must stop first, and wait until the parking indicator of the student car gradually disappears, confirming the safety. Then drive slowly. The law also stipulates that all vehicles must not overtake when driving with children; school buses can be used on bus-only routes, and priority should be given to school buses when encountering small traffic accidents; when carrying children under 6 years of age You must wear a seat belt inside the car. If you violate the regulations, you will be fined 30,000 won. Kindergartens, primary schools, schools for the disabled, and nurseries will be classified as "children's protection zones." More than 30 kilometres per hour. The Road Traffic Law also stipulates that when a school bus picks up a child, there should be a lecturer, a special school teacher, a childcare worker, a sports facility administrator, and other relevant protection workers. South Korea's motor vehicle application for becoming a school bus is relatively strict.

First, it applies to the local police station and obtains a certificate of approval. The school bus driver or operator must affix the approved certificate to the right side of the front glass to begin operation. Vehicles that are not approved may not imitate the color of the school bus or make similar marks, and may not undertake the work of picking up students. The car owners have changed the model and internal structure, and also put forward strict requirements, including a set of application procedures, including the submission of necessary materials for the inspection of traffic safety vehicles, the comprehensive renovation certificate, the vehicle structure inspection certificate, and the declaration of the police station inspection certificate. and many more. South Korea also has specific requirements for the school bus itself. For preschool children and students, the color of the "protected car" is uniformly yellow; the height of the first step of the door is 30 cm; the height of the second step is 20 cm; the right side of the front glass and the center of the rear of the car are affixed with "child protection vehicles". "The school bus should clarify the owner of the car. If there is a partnership operator, it must be explained; the school bus must be integrated into the insurance; the seat belt must conform to the child's body shape; the vehicle doors and windows must be open; the folding chair should not be placed inside the car.

== Europe ==
=== France ===
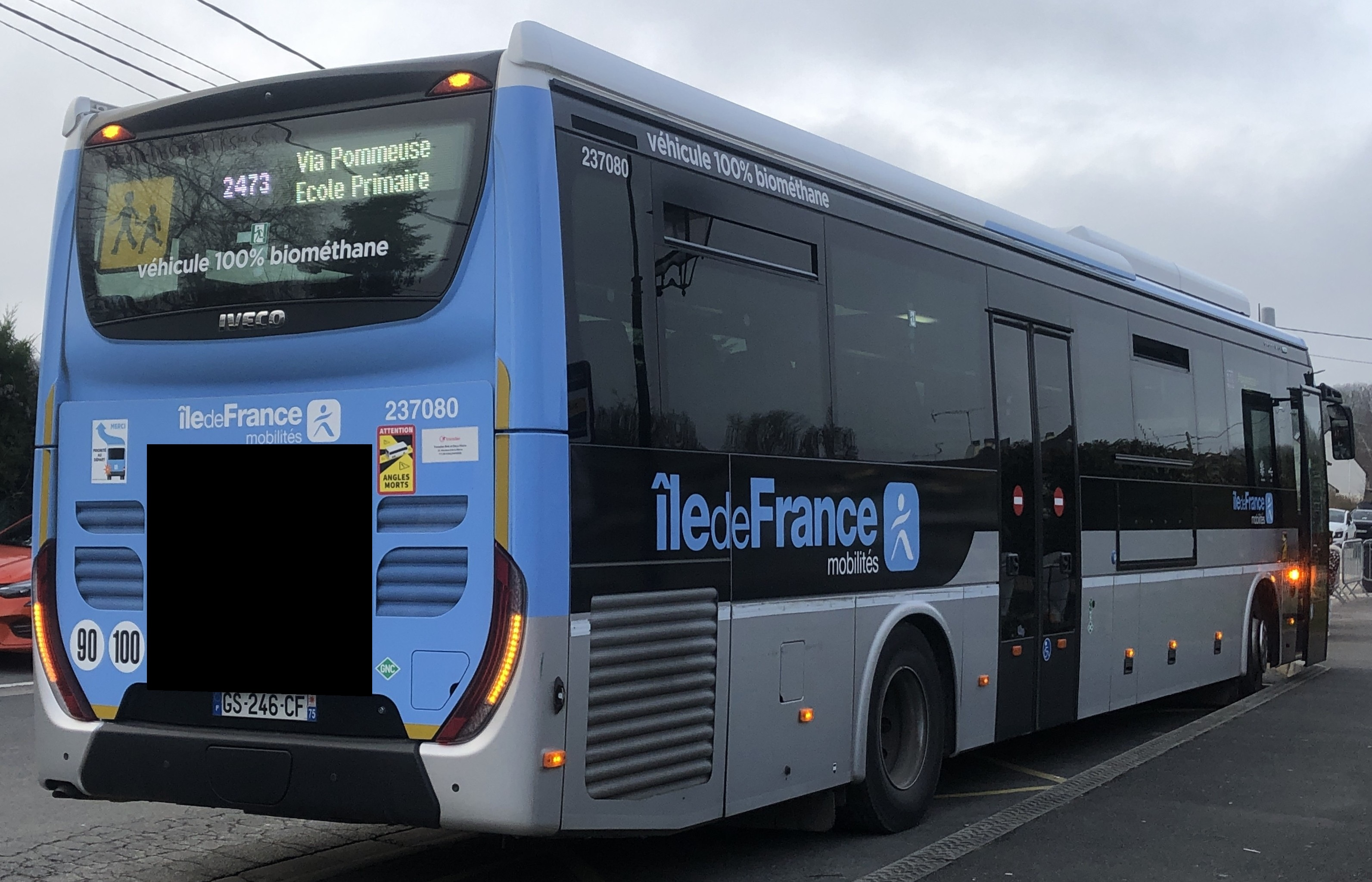
Iveco Crossway Line Natural Power n°237080 on the line 2473 of Brie et 2 Morin, waiting his passengers at Ecole Primaire.

In France, especially in Île-de-France and in small towns, there are special services which operate at the start and end of each school day and do not run during weekends, holiday periods or summer. The vehicles operated can be normal buses or coaches.

Due to security reasons, the coaches are equipped with a yellow square on the front and/or the back to inform drivers of a presence of a school coach. These are generally found on buses operating long-distance routes and on coaches taking highways or country lanes. Seat belts are mandatory.

There are also "red buses" operated by SAVAC (Services automobiles de la vallée de Chevreuse), operating during school trips.

School bus lines can be categorized in two categories :

- Lignes à vocation scolaire (School lines) are open to the general public only if the non-students don't cause any inconvenience, don't represent a threat and if the bus has vacancy, otherwise the school bus driver has the right to deny non-students entry. However, general public are limited to school bus lines who serves secondary schools.
- Circuits spéciaux scolaires or CSS (Specific school bus lines) are restricted to students. These school lines mainly serves primary schools but also secondary schools, general public are barred without an authorization of the government authority (Île-de-France Mobilités, BreizhGo, Fluo Grand Est, Nomad, etc...) or by private companies (Nedroma, Cars Moreau, Cars Bleus, etc...).

=== Germany ===
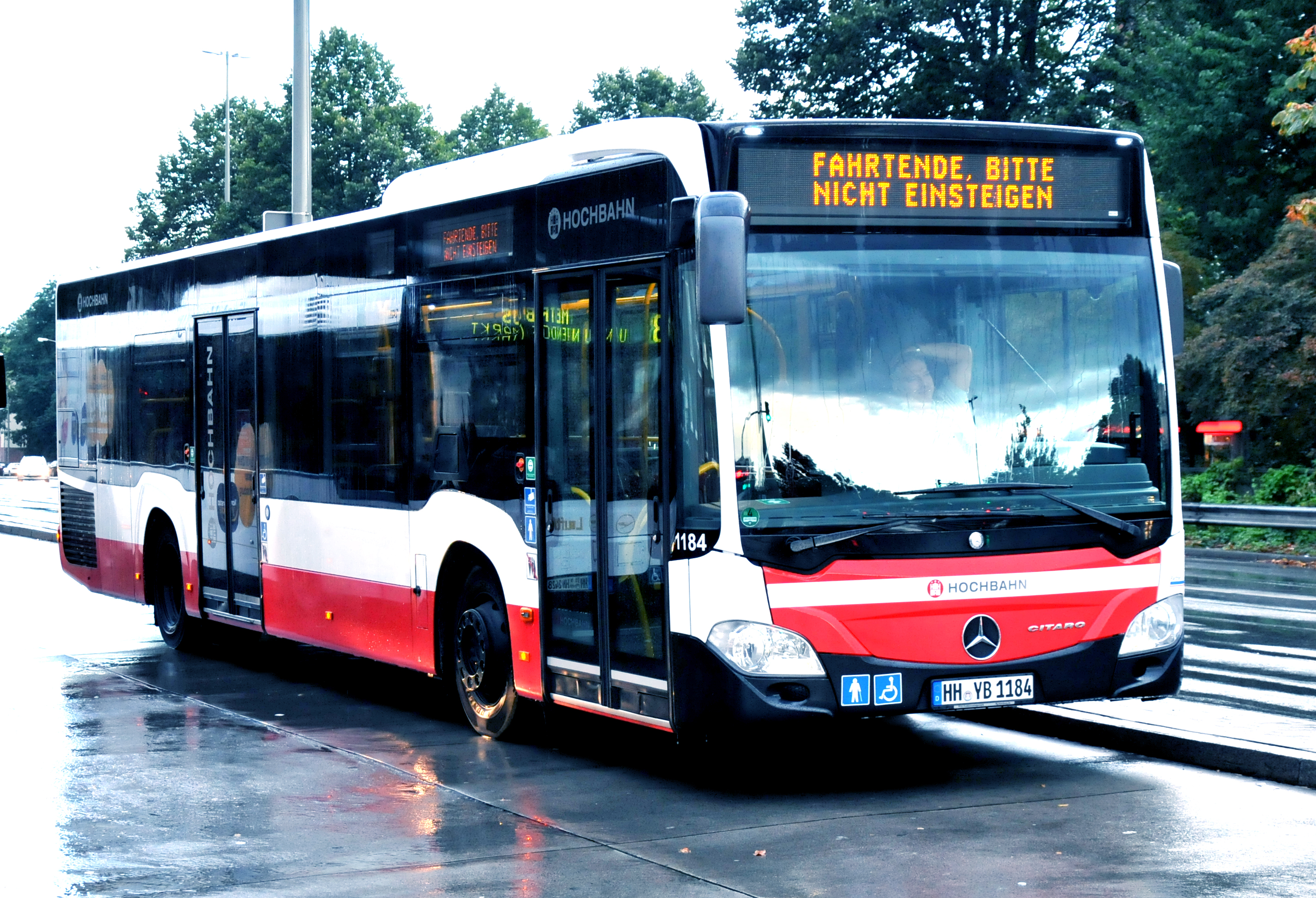
A Mercedes-Benz school bus in Hamburg

In Germany, students travel to school on scheduled public train and bus routes. In most cases, these services operate at times to suit school hours and are not run during weekends and holiday periods, though the services are open to use by non-school-related travelers. Local authorities subsidize the routes, but parents or guardians are sometimes required to pay a contribution to the cost of a season ticket for use of the services. Many students use their own bicycles to travel to school and may take these with them when a part of the journey is by train.

As student transport is heavily dependent on the public transport system in urban areas, most students are transported on mass-transit or intercity buses along with minibuses in support. To distinguish themselves from other buses, routes that only transport students are required to have a destination sign worded "Schulbus" with a yellow background. German traffic law gives traffic priority to school buses unloading and loading students; buses are to warn traffic using their four-way hazard lights.

The maximum speed for German school buses varies. While coaches are typically limited to 80 kilometres per hour (50 mph), any buses with standing passengers are limited to 60 kilometres per hour (37 mph).

=== Italy ===
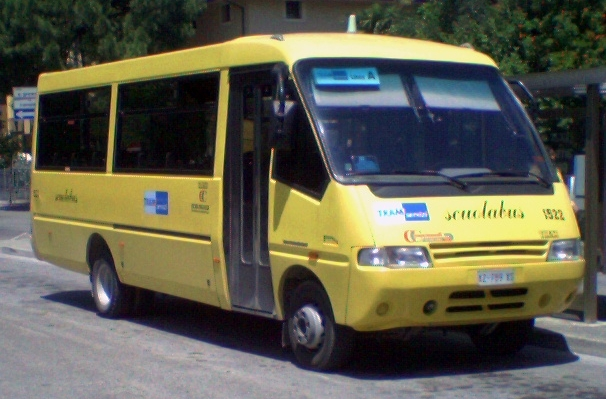
A Cacciamali Thesi/Iveco school bus in Rimini, Italy

In Italy, school buses are typically painted yellow or orange. The vehicles used for student transport are usually minibuses. As in North America, school buses run on fixed routes and stops.

While only a legal requirement for bus transporting Materne (preschool) students, school bus drivers are provided with an aide to manage the students on the bus.

=== Kazakhstan ===
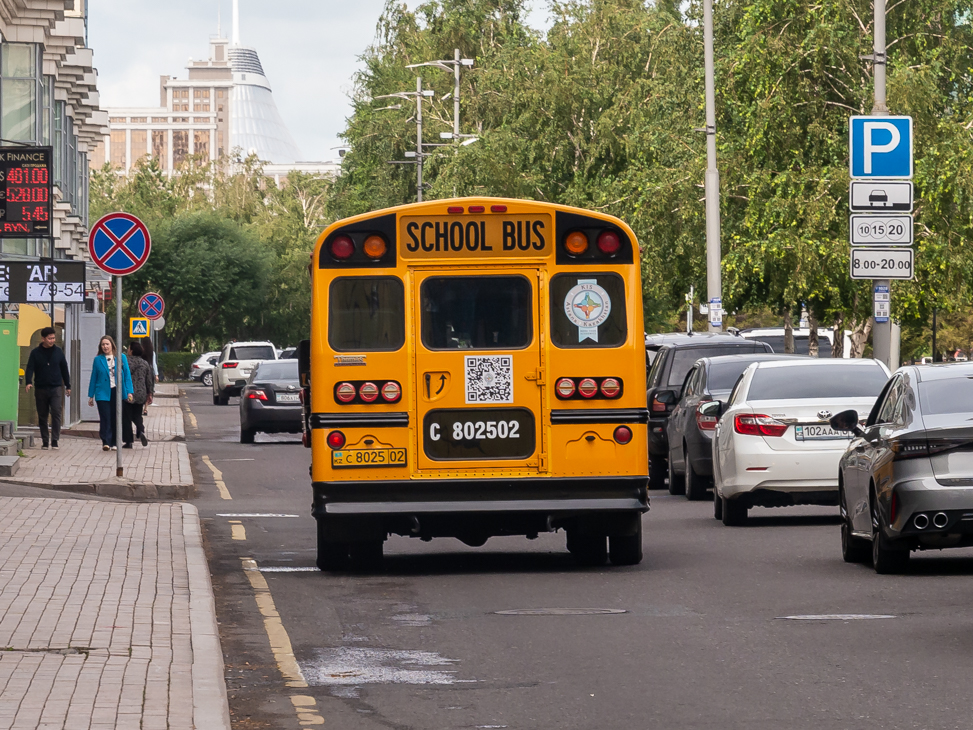
School bus in Astana, Kazakhstan

In Kazakhstan, student transport has historically depended on local policies and school funding. In urban areas, students primarily relied on public transportation, while in rural regions, schools provided their own transport services using midibuses or contracted private vehicles to serve as school buses (мектеп автобусы, mektep avtobusy). Some of the midibuses were repainted yellow to resemble school buses in North America, though most retained the same features and default colors of their transportation providers. Private schools were more likely to offer dedicated student transport, often using minibuses.

American-style yellow school buses were introduced in Kazakhstan in 2013, starting in Astana, when the private company Schoolbus, a school bus contractor, launched a demand-responsive student transport service. This initiative provided a safer and more structured alternative for students. Over time, similar services expanded to other cities and regions, enhancing both accessibility and safety. As demand grew, urban areas began acquiring newer buses that more closely resembled American school buses, featuring their distinctive yellow color and safety features. The first domestically produced school bus was assembled in 2017 in Semey.

While students in cities like Almaty and Astana still rely heavily on public transport, an increasing number of standardized school buses have been introduced in public schools to offer safer and more reliable transportation. These school buses include two widely used mass-produced models: Yutong (manufactured by QazTehna since 2022) and Hyundai (manufactured by Astana Motors since 2023), both closely modeled after American school buses. They feature the signature school bus yellow color and are marked with the bilingual words БАЛАЛАР (BALALAR) and ДЕТИ (DETI) ("Children" in Kazakh and Russian languages) on the sides. In addition to seat belts, these modern school buses are equipped with a range of safety features, including fire protection systems, emergency exits, 360-degree driver visibility, accommodations for disabled passengers, and heating and air conditioning for year-round comfort.

=== Poland ===
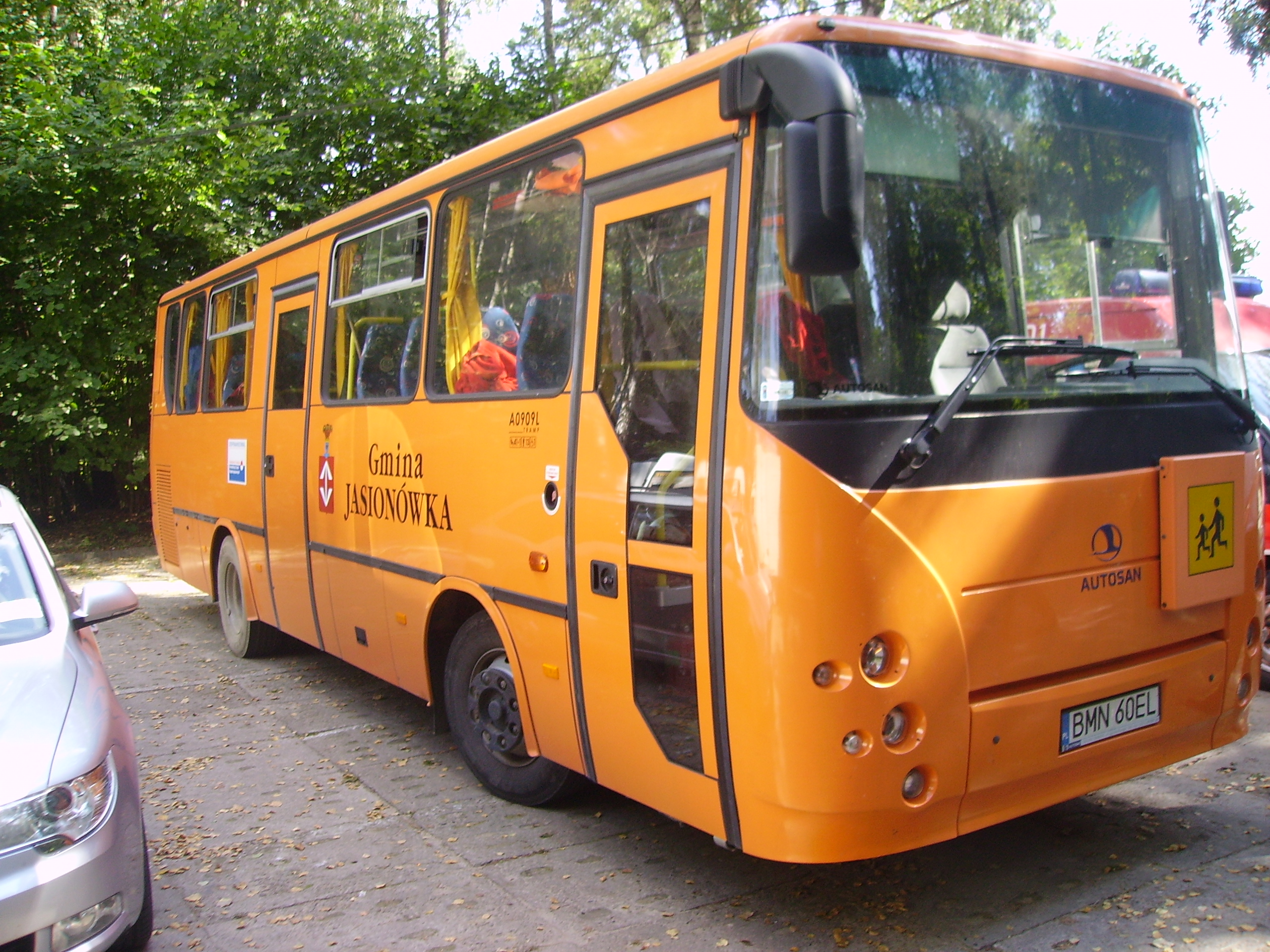
2009 Autosan Tramp school bus in Gmina Jasionówka, Podlaskie Voivodeship, Poland

In Poland, school buses are used in a similar fashion to those in the United States, to connect residents of rural areas to schools located further away. While officially lettered autobus szkolny (Polish for "school bus"), they are colloquially known as gimbus.

Along with their counterparts in North America, school buses in Poland have several design features to differentiate them from standard buses. First, all school buses are painted orange. Inside, the driver's compartment is not allowed to be blocked from the passenger compartment. The rear door, if present, must be able to be locked by the driver. All doors must lock automatically at speeds above 5 kilometres per hour (3.1 mph).

=== Russia ===
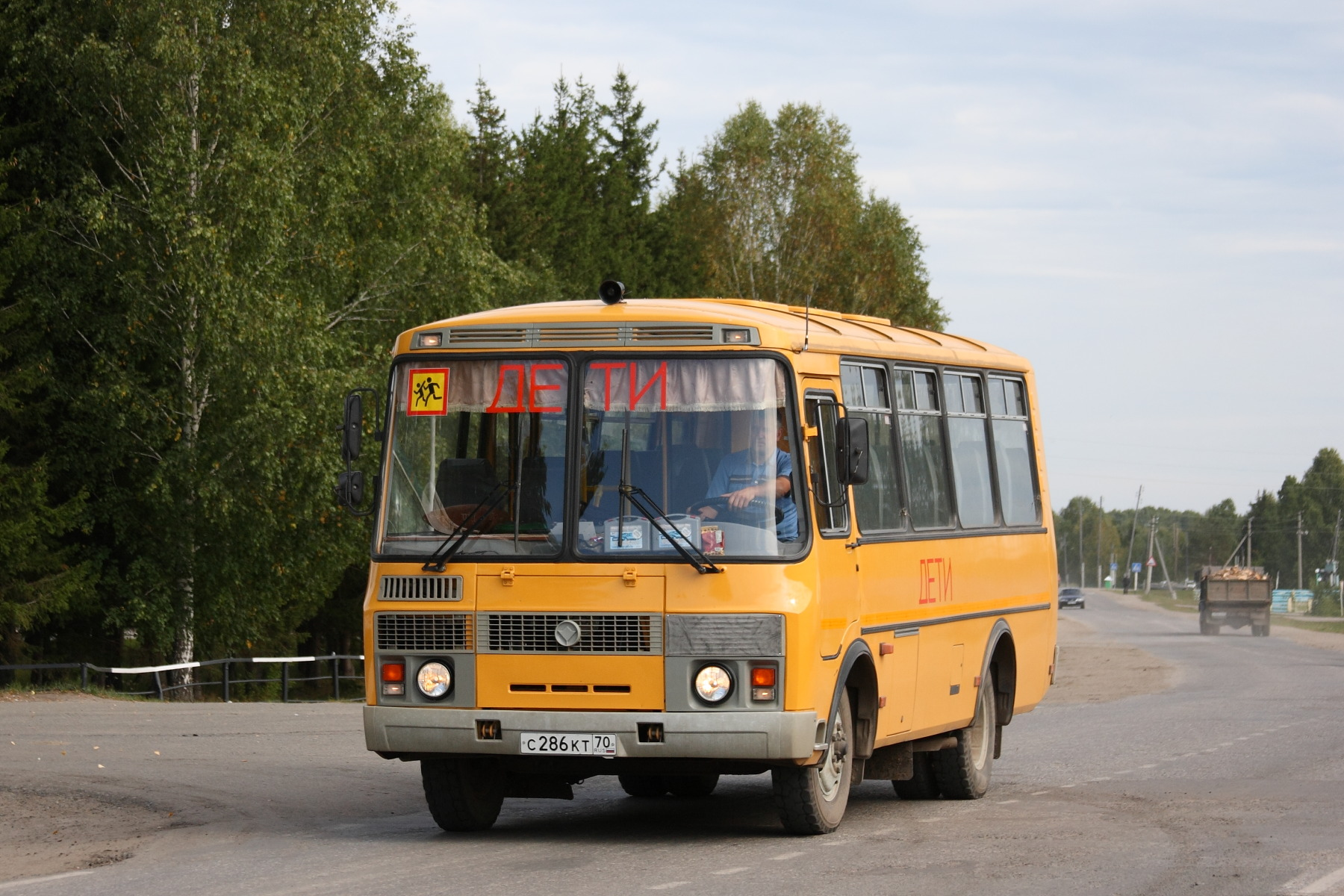
PAZ-32053 in use as a school bus in Tomsk Oblast

Like school buses in North America, school buses in Russia are allowed to stop traffic (with both lights and alarms) when loading and unloading students at bus stops. School bus drivers are also accompanied by aides, who are given their own seating on the bus; buses also have onboard luggage space.

Buses transporting children must be painted yellow, have the word ДЕТИ (DETI, "Children") in capital letters on all four sides of the bus, and display "transportation of children" graphic signs on the front and rear. All school buses are restricted to a maximum speed of 60 kilometres per hour (37 mph).

Prior to 1999, buses intended for transporting school children differed only in their route identification; there were no additional regulations on school bus design. In 2001, the Russian government began to acquire dedicated school buses to transport students in rural areas. In urban areas, school buses are comparatively rare, and are used mainly for special events and field trips.

=== Romania ===
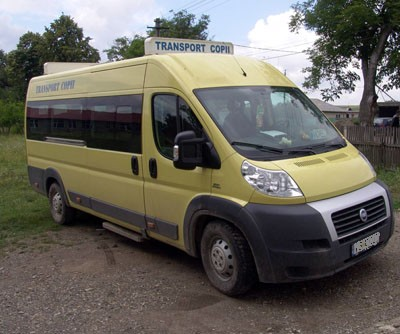
The older Fiat Ducato 2006 model used for Romanian school buses

In Romania, school buses owned by state consist of two models of minibuses. They can either be the newer Renault Master Trabus or an old Fiat Ducato 2006 minibus. These minibuses are painted either greenish yellow (Fiat Ducato 2006) or school bus yellow (Renault Master Trabus)Most minibuses have signs on top of them with inscriptions reading "Transport Elevi" which means "Student Transport" in Romanian. Additionally, these minibuses are almost only present in the rural regions, where there is one school per comune (a comune is an administrative unit in Romania that consists of multiple villages, where they all share the same school and administrative buildings) and kids live at greater distances from school. However, in the city, there is no school transport service, as there are multiple schools per city, and almost all students live within walking distance of their own school.

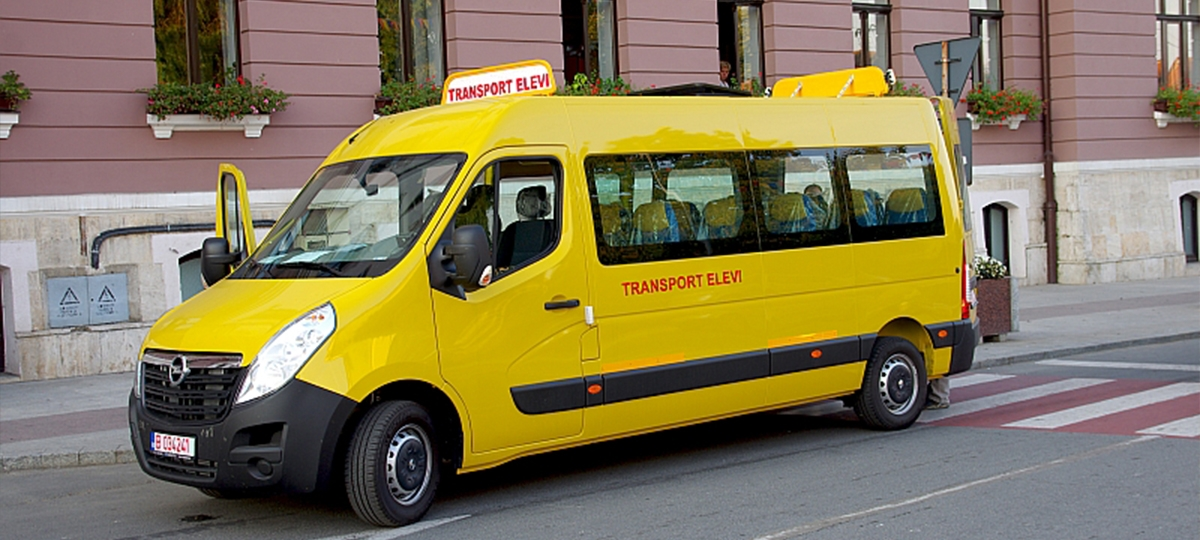
The newer Renault Master Trabus model used for Romanian school buses

Note: There may be other models of school buses seen on the road, but they are rare, and owned by private schools where the brands are not as regulated as they are for state-owned buses.

=== Spain ===
In Spain, school buses are not painted in any specific way. While Spanish public schools are usually obliged by law to guarantee a free bus route for every student if it is the closest to their place of residence, these buses are common chartered buses hired by schools with a special public fund, yet on behalf of themselves. However, when performing as school buses, vehicles carry an approved V-10 Sign ("Transporte Escolar", School Transport) in the front side of the vehicle, indicating their duty and the need to take precautions around it.

=== Ukraine ===
As in many other countries, in Ukraine, school buses are painted yellow or orange. In Ukrainian school buses are called "шкільний автобус" (Shkil'niy Avtobus).

=== United Kingdom ===
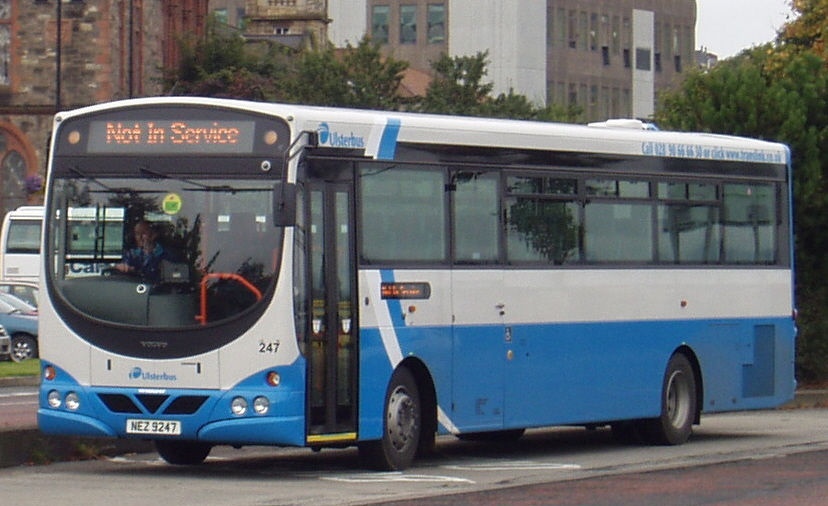
2007 Wright Eclipse SchoolRun bodied Volvo B7R of Ulsterbus

In the United Kingdom, student transport by bus is usually provided by local scheduled public transport bus services. Dedicated bus services for school students are usually contracted out to local bus companies, using ordinary buses that are used for other purposes when not in use for school journeys.

In the United Kingdom all children between 5 and 16 years old are qualified for free school transport if they live more than two miles (children under 8 years old) or three miles (children 8 years old or older) from the nearest school. In addition all children qualify if there is no safe walking route. Special needs children qualify if they cannot walk to school, whatever the distance.

During the 1990s, local governments began to establish a dedicated network of school bus service. To replace Leyland double-decker buses of the early 1980s, right-hand drive Blue Bird Corporation school buses were imported from the United States. In the private sector, in 2000, FirstGroup launched First Student UK, using the same school bus yellow livery as on American school buses. While initially using right-hand drive Blue Bird TC/2000s imported from the United States, the company switched to Turkish-produced BMC 1100 buses later in the 2000s.

MyBus is a group of bus contractors (including First Student UK) that use school buses solely for school transport. Buses are fitted with seat belts, and full-time drivers are assigned to each route.

Alongside importation of right-hand drive American vehicles and BMC-produced school buses, from 2006 to 2008, Wrightbus (of Northern Ireland) produced the Wright Eclipse SchoolRun. Adapting the Wright Eclipse into a high-floor design for school bus use, the SchoolRun was a 66-passenger bus, with 2+3 seating (most full-size American school buses have 3+3 seating) along with a side wheelchair lift (standard on the final 50 examples produced).

Children with more complex needs or disabilities are often transported to special schools in purpose-built minibuses. In a similar fashion to their counterparts in North America, these minibuses are school bus bodies fitted to full-size van chassis. In Europe, the Ford Transit and the Mercedes-Benz Vario are popular donor chassis for such vehicles.

School Buses of the United Kingdom

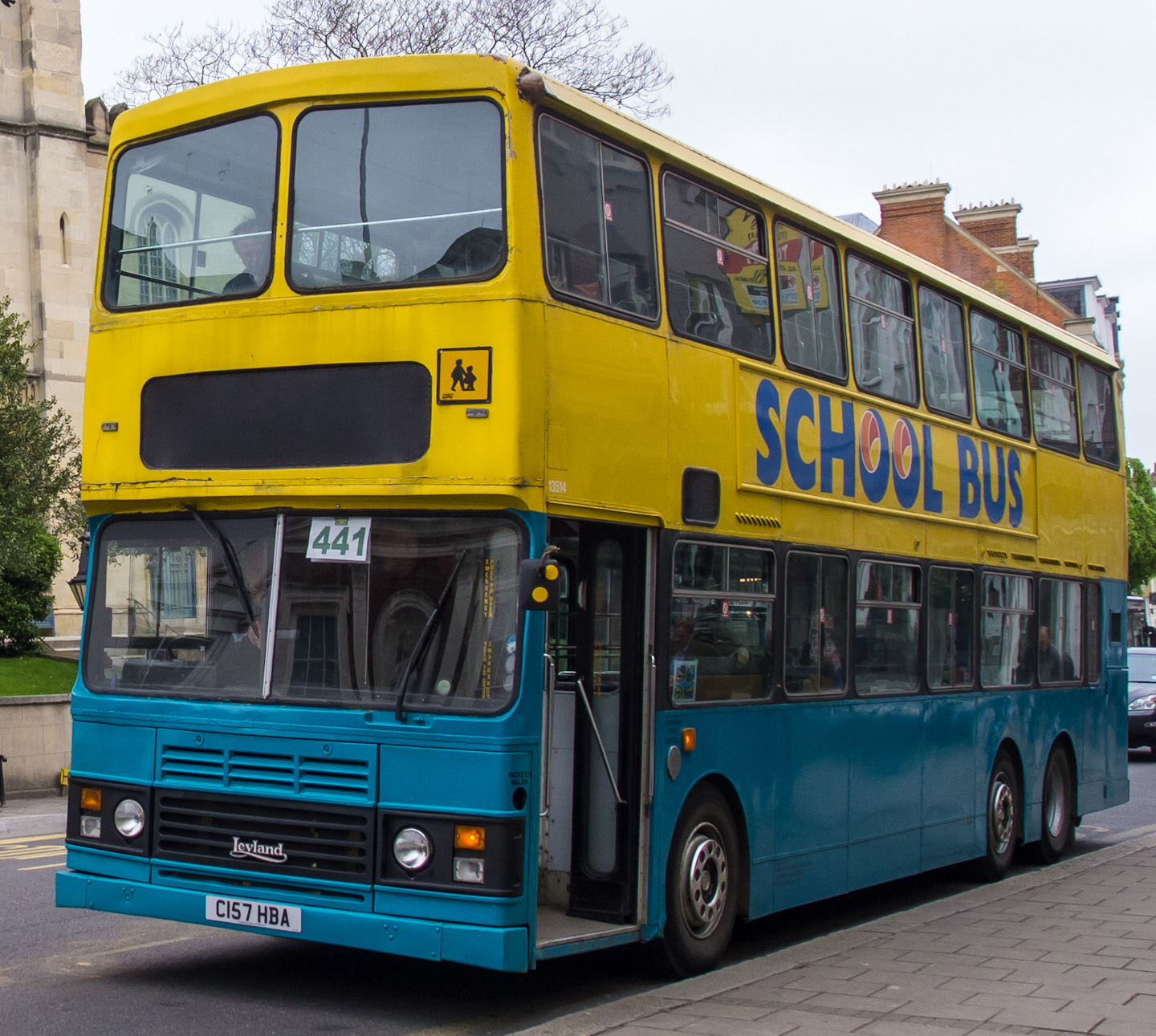
1986 Leyland Olympian (imported from Hong Kong) in the United Kingdom

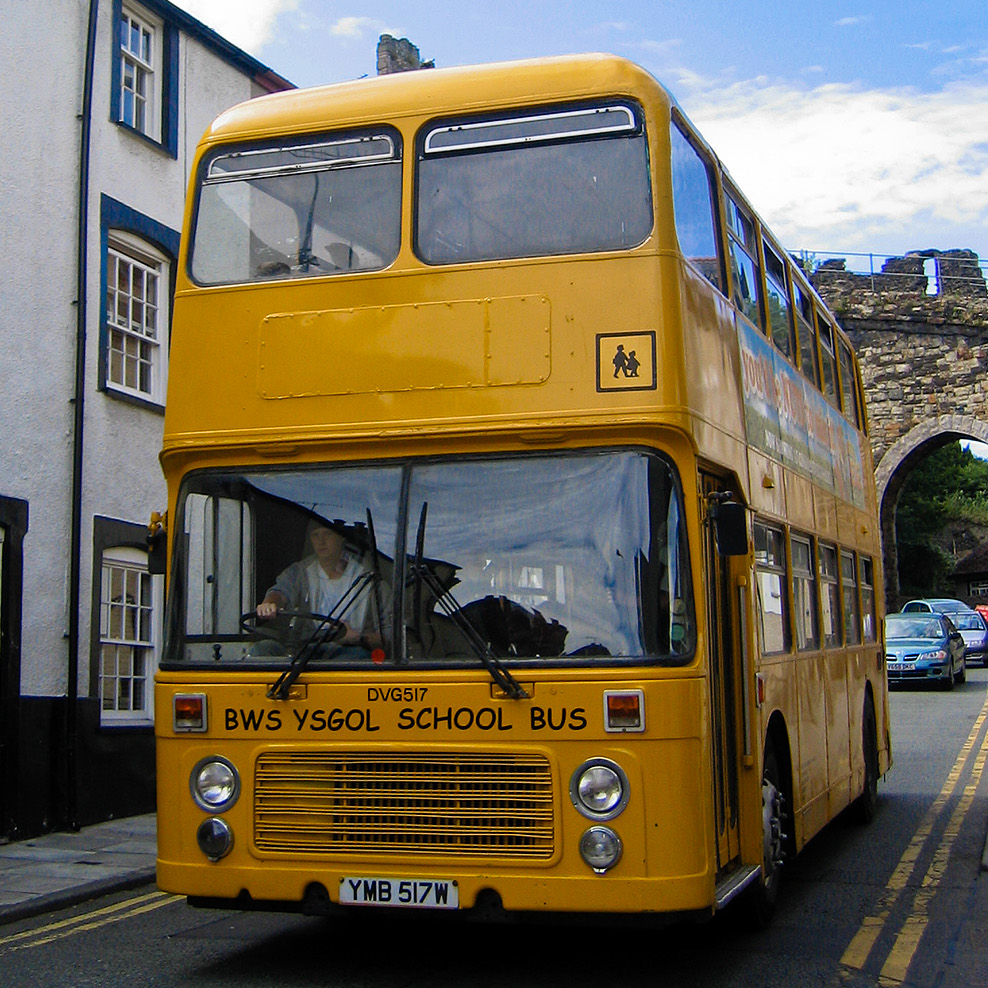
1981 Bristol VRT "BWS YSGOL" (Welsh translation of "school bus") in Wales in 2006

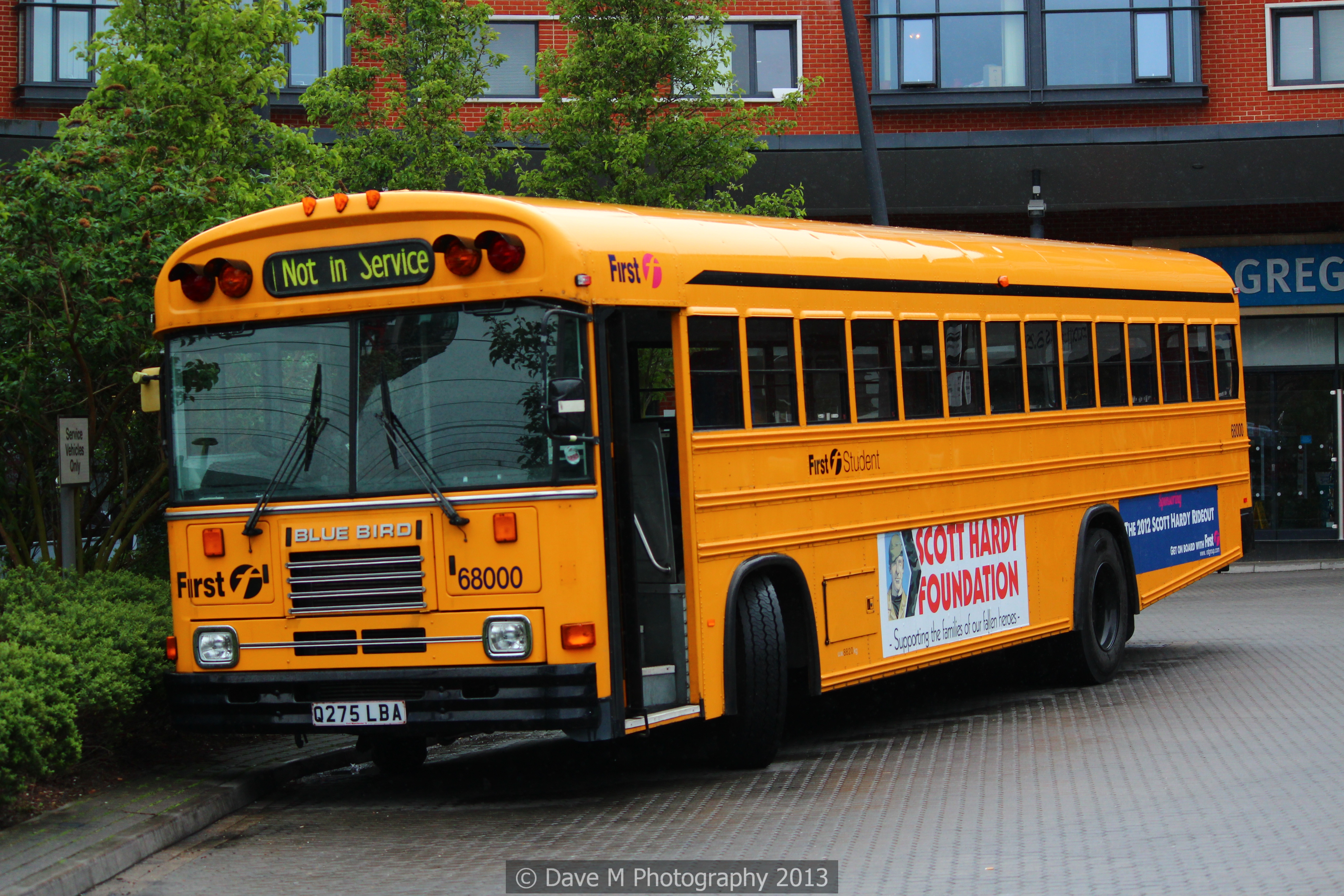
First Student Blue Bird TC/2000 in Essex; bus is imported from the United States.

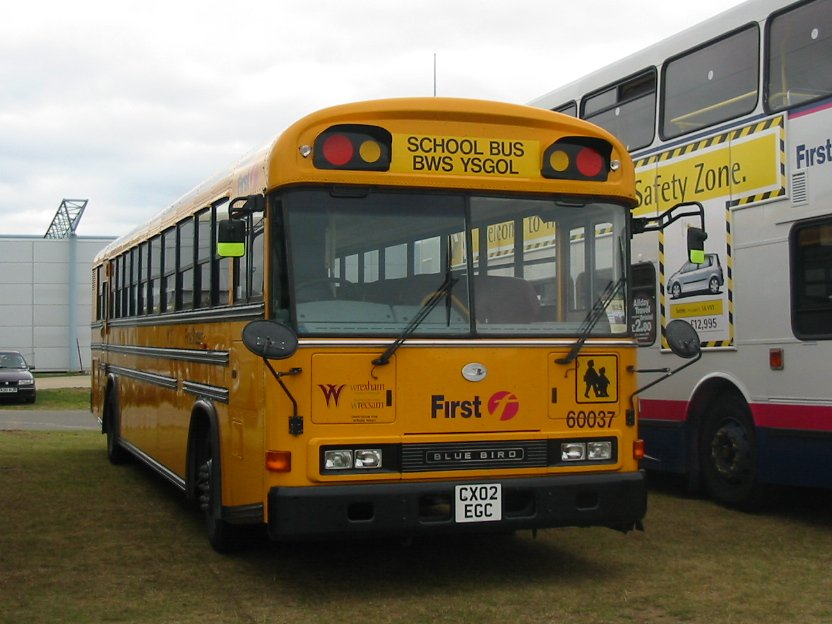
First Student TC/3000 RE "BWS YSGOL" (Welsh School Bus); RHD Blue Bird All American

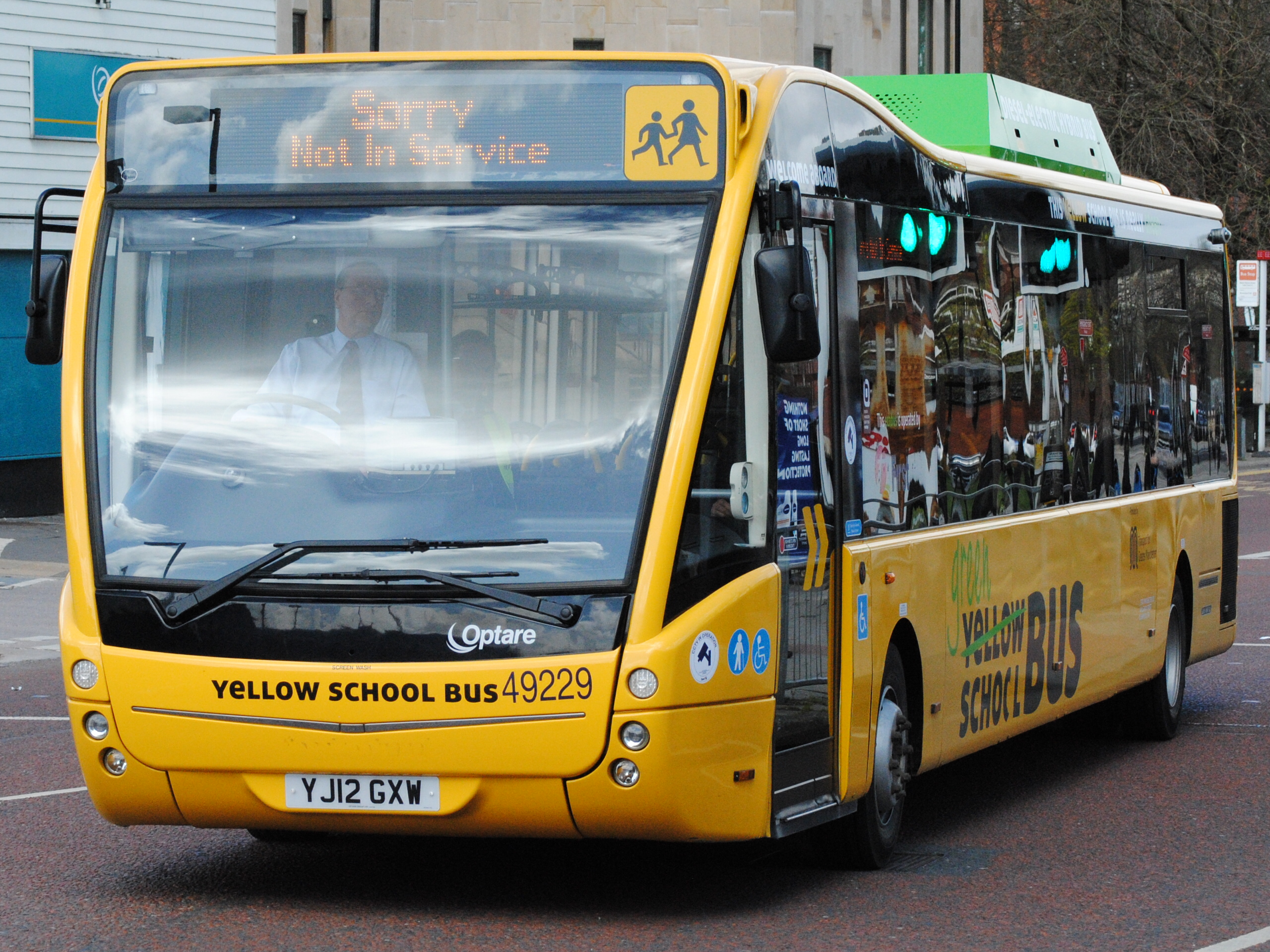
Optare Versa Hybrid of Maytree Travel

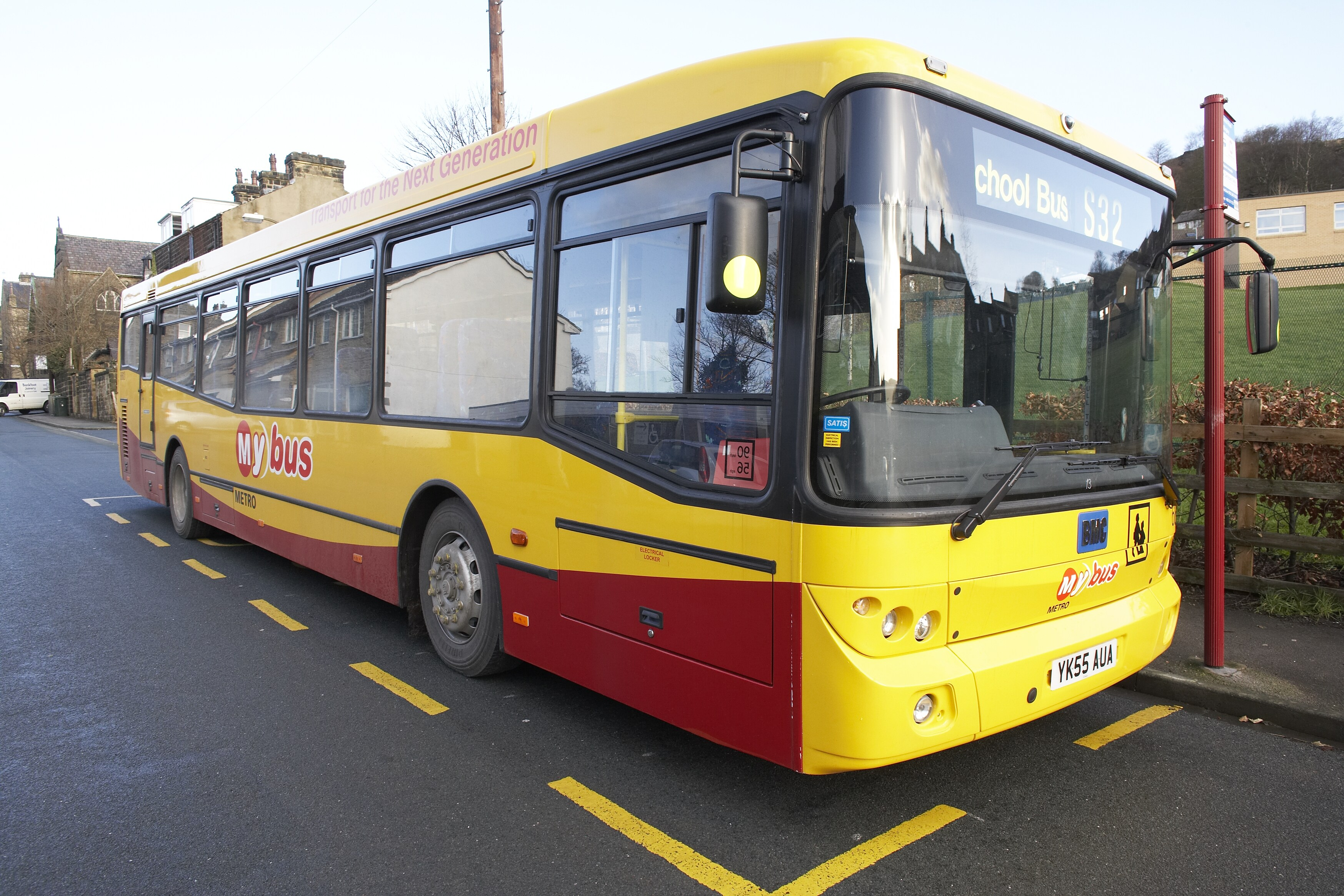
BMC220 of MyBus

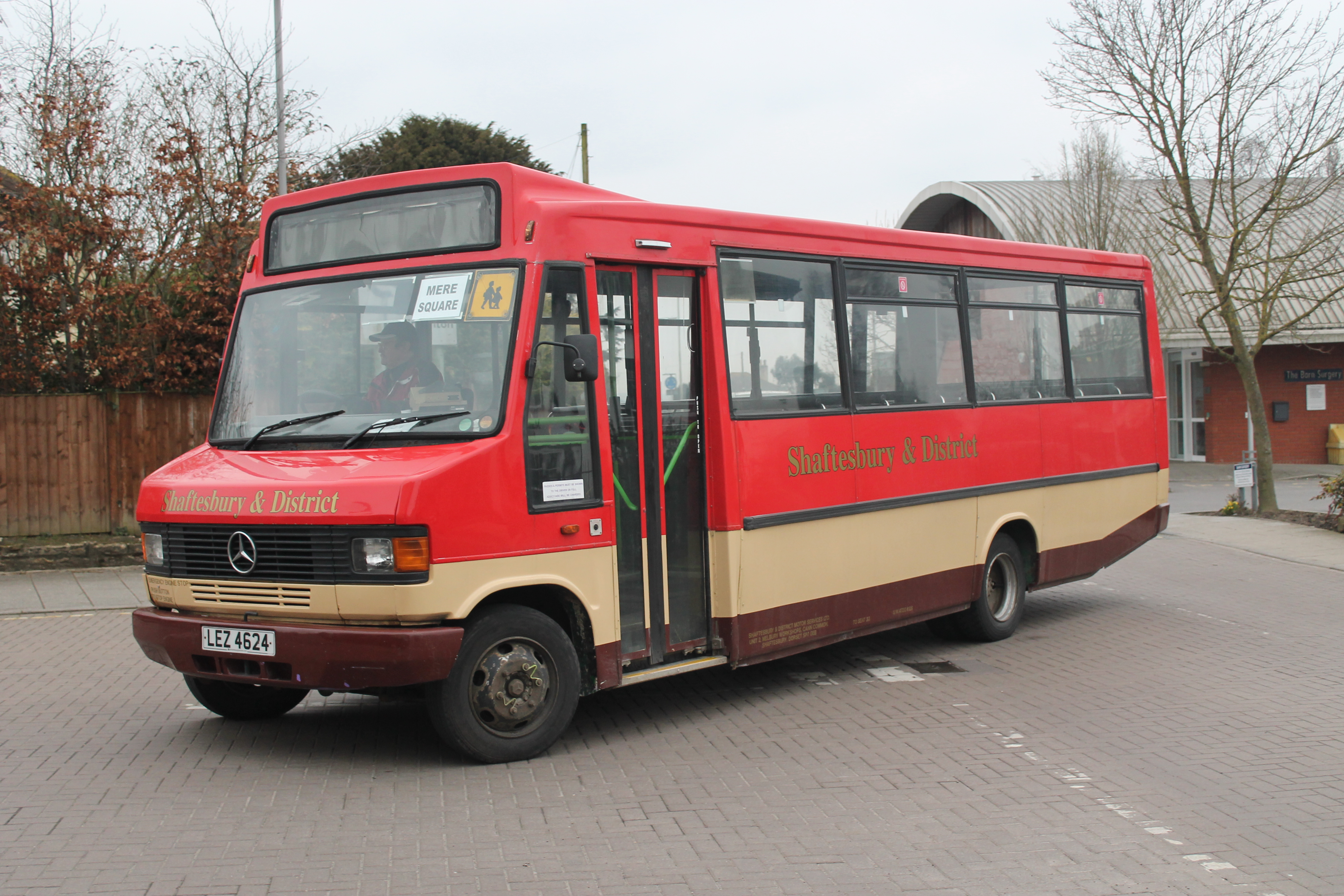
Plaxton Beaver on Mercedes-Benz chassis in London

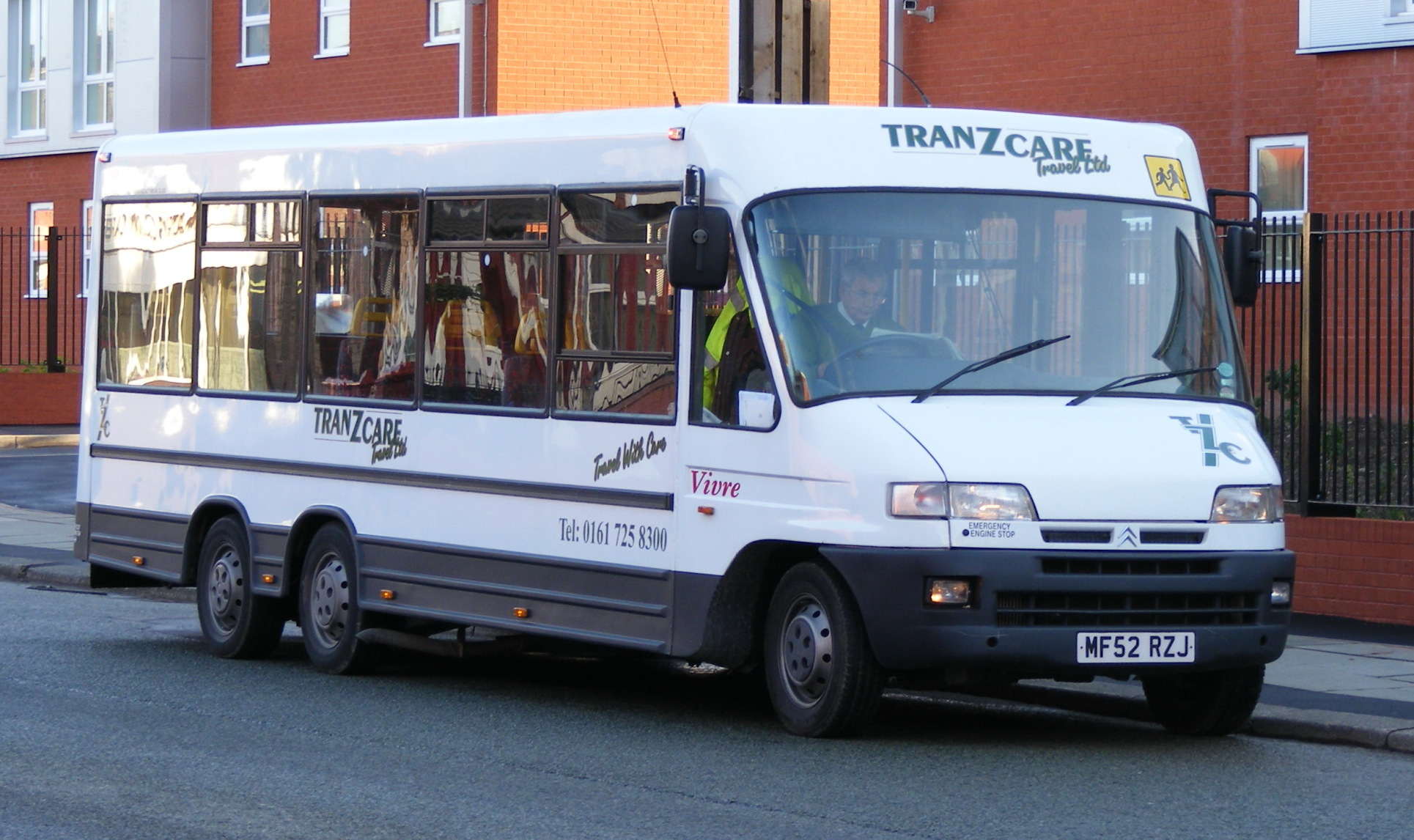
Citroen Jumper school bus (Cunliffe & Son Vivre body)

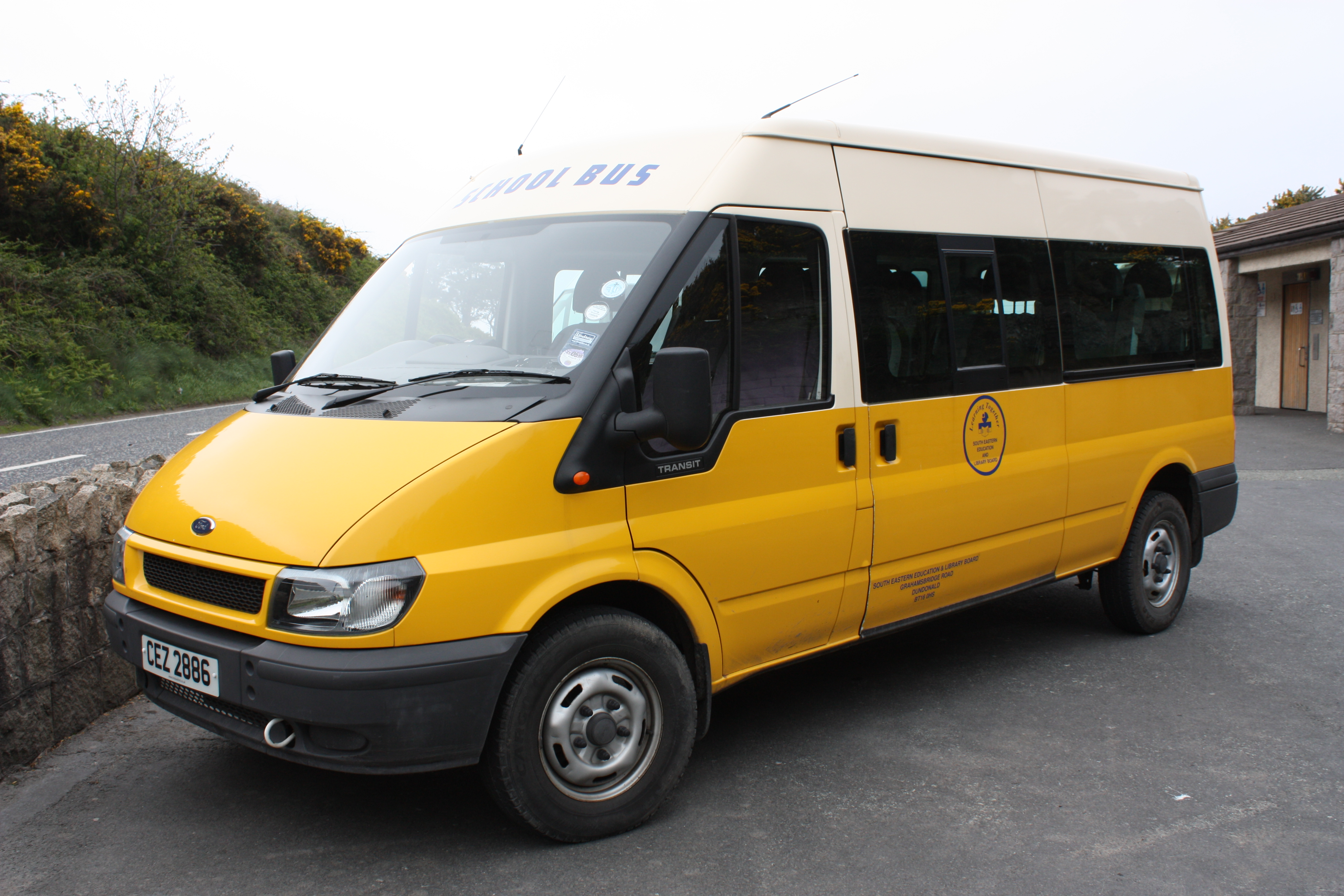
2000s Ford Transit in Northern Ireland

== North America ==
=== Canada ===
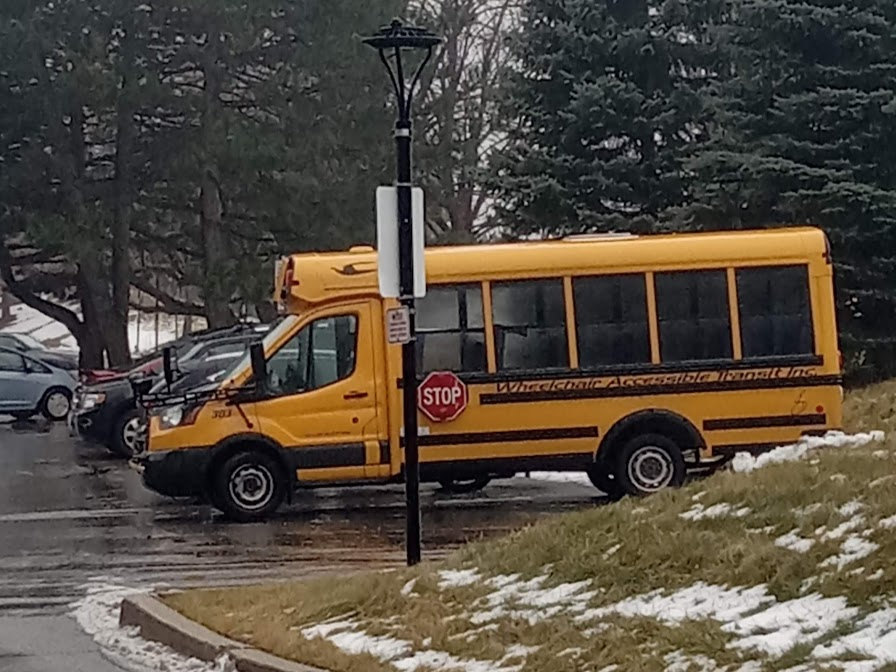
Van chassis-based school bus in North York.

Canadian school buses are similar to their U.S. counterparts both in terms of overall design and their usage by school systems. The primary functional difference is the adaptation to the bilingual population of Canada. In francophone Quebec, the signage on the outside of the bus is in French; the front and rear legends read écoliers"—French for "Schoolchildren" ("School Bus" translated into French is the much longer "autobus scolaire"). The stop signal arm legend may read arrêt, French for "Stop", or may have both "stop" and "arrêt". In addition, all emergency exit designations and instructions are required to be bilingual. Further safety requirements may be introduced at a provincial or even local level; for example, some coastal jurisdictions where fog is common insist on buses being fitted with roof-mounted strobe lights for use in poor visibility.

As Canada does not use the customary system, instrument panel gauges are calibrated in metric units. School buses, like all other Canadian vehicles, are equipped with daytime running lights (DRLs). Older buses not equipped with DRLs are driven with headlights on.

Buses are sometimes marketed to customers in Canada differently from in the United States. In one example, the Blue Bird All American is rebadged as the Blue Bird TX3 in Canada (and other export markets). Additionally, of the three regionally focused brands sold by Collins Industries, only Corbeil is sold in Canada, due to its previous manufacturing base in Quebec.

The Lion Electric Company (in French, La Compagnie Électrique Lion) is a manufacturer based in Saint-Jérôme, Quebec that specializes in vehicles powered by battery-electric powertrains.

=== Mexico ===
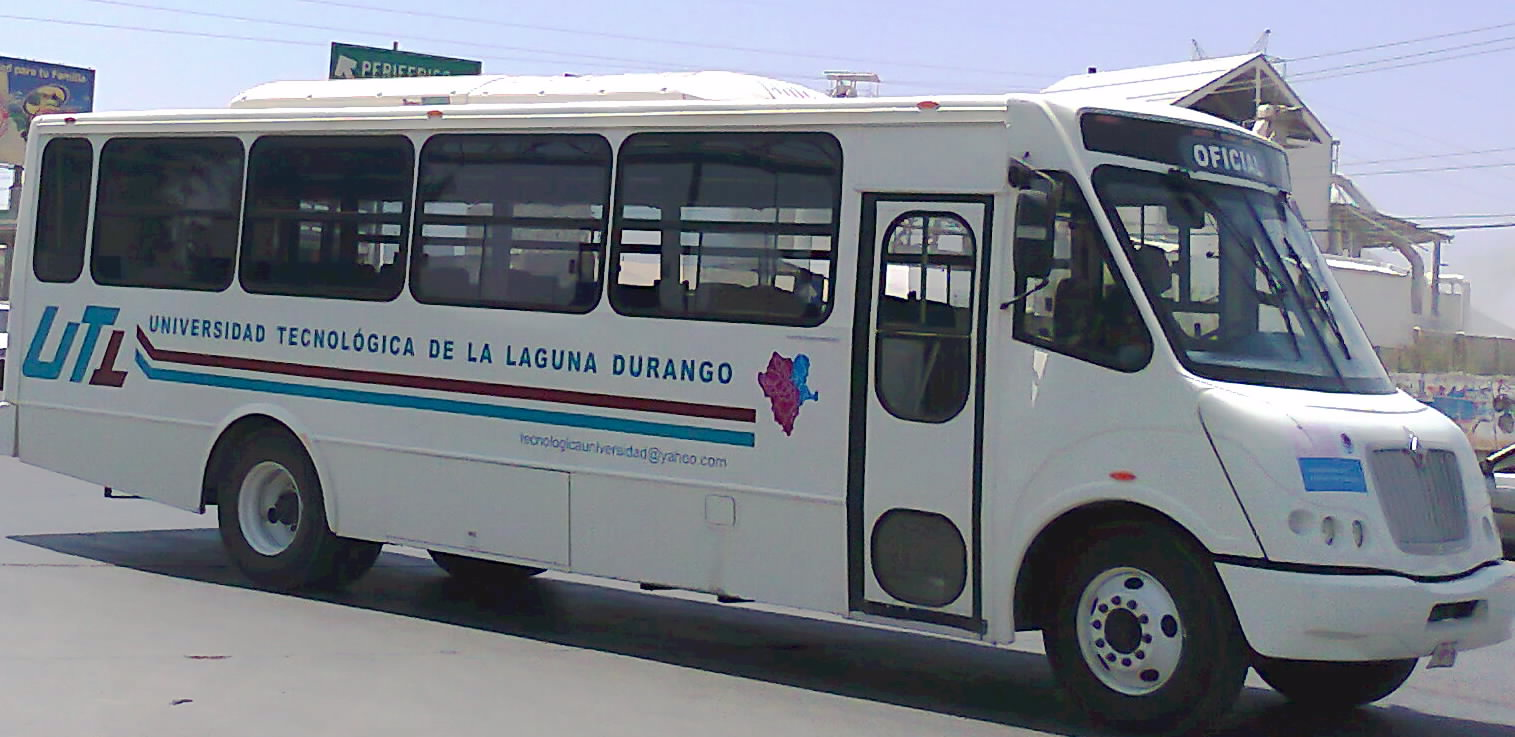
Purpose-built school bus in Mexico

In Mexico, in addition to yellow school buses seen from the United States, various other types of buses are used in the role of student transport. As in the United States, many schools own their own fleets of school buses; school bus yellow is not a government regulation, so most buses are painted in individual school colors. Depending on capacity needs, vans, minibuses and midibuses are also used. Among retired American school buses, some newer ones are imported into Mexico and put back into school service.

Unlike the United States and Canada, school-owned buses are not primarily used for route service (due to high cost); instead, they are often used for field trips and other related excursions. In addition to students using regular transit systems, several Mexican companies specialize in scheduled student transportation.

==== School transportation program of Mexico City (PROTE) ====
The program began with a first phase of application during the 2008 to 2009 school year and the second during the 2009 to 2010 school year. Only for private basic education schools.

Until August 2014, there were a total of 943 buses that offer school transport service, guaranteeing clean emissions and safe routes for students. This service is provided by companies that grant the service.

Counting each unit with satellite tracking providing information in real time of the journey, in addition to having the Ministry of Public Security so that in case of any unfortunate situation.

Until December 2016 there were 63 private basic education schools that are integrated into the school transportation plan.

===== Price of the school transportation =====
These types of transportation are not mandatory in all schools and parents who request it pay for it, having a fee agreed with the principal of the schools.

In 2008, when the program was implemented, the cost was approximately $600 M.N. per month. Until February 17, 2017 obligatory school transportation had an average cost of $800 M.N. per month.

===== Segregation in the school transportation =====
When the program was implemented, it was only mandatory for schools with more than 1,240 students. That amount is reduced in each school year, reaching the 2013–2014 school year, reaching schools that have more than 490 students and can exempt the use of transportation obligatory school.

Many educational institutions that oppose, cataloged the unfair program and even some coming to cover themselves, achieving that the minister, José Fernando Franco González Salas, belonging to the Supreme Court of Justice of the Nation (SCJN), cataloged the School transportation program of Mexico City (PROTE) as a program that It grants a differentiated treatment without an objective and reasonable justification, since this program obliges the schools of the district to offer the service according to the number of students they have.

==== Universities with school bus ====
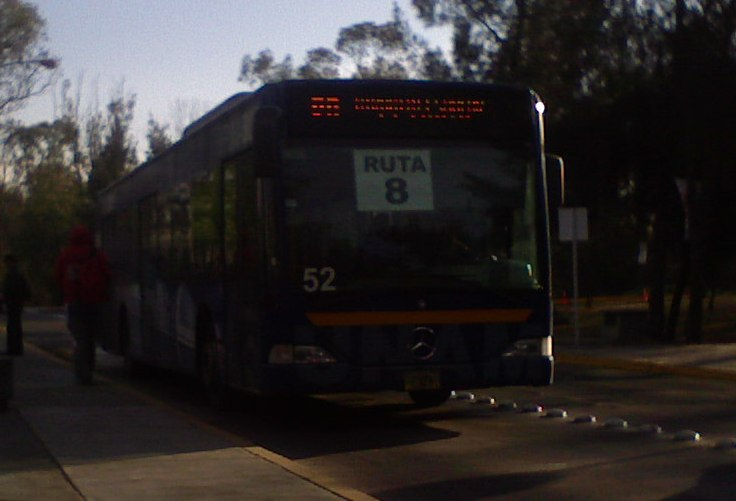
Route 8 of Pumabus

===== Pumabus (UNAM) =====
The National Autonomous University of Mexico (UNAM) has a free bus service called Pumabus, which is accessible to the university community and visitors. It has 12 routes and an express route, which circulate through a special lane within the University, also having an app called pumawaze, which helps find routes. This routes connect several points of the campus with Massive Transport Systems located near the complex (Metro, Metrobus and several local bus lines).

Each pumabus has an approximate capacity of 75 to 90 people, it also has special places for the disabled people, has security cameras and alert buttons.

Currently the UNAM has 58 buses that transport more than 136 thousand users per day, of which eight are reserved, 10 are ecological and 50 with permanent circulation all the routes with a schedule from 06:00 to 22:00 hours during weekdays, on weekends only the routes that does not gives services to cultural and sport centers, like the Universum Museum, Nezahualcoyotl Concert Hall and University Stadium. This service uses Low-Floor Mercedes Benz Citaro buses along with conventional units.

Pumabus Service, also have a disabled people service on demand, this service could be planned with previous anticipation.

===== TransporTEC (ITESM) =====
The school transport offered by Tecnológico de Monterrey (ITESM) called TransporTEC, is only for students enrolled in that institution, teachers and active collaborators.

This type of transportation is in each campus of the Mexican Republic and its price may vary according to the established prices of each campus; it can only be used with the current school credential.

== Oceania ==
=== Australia ===
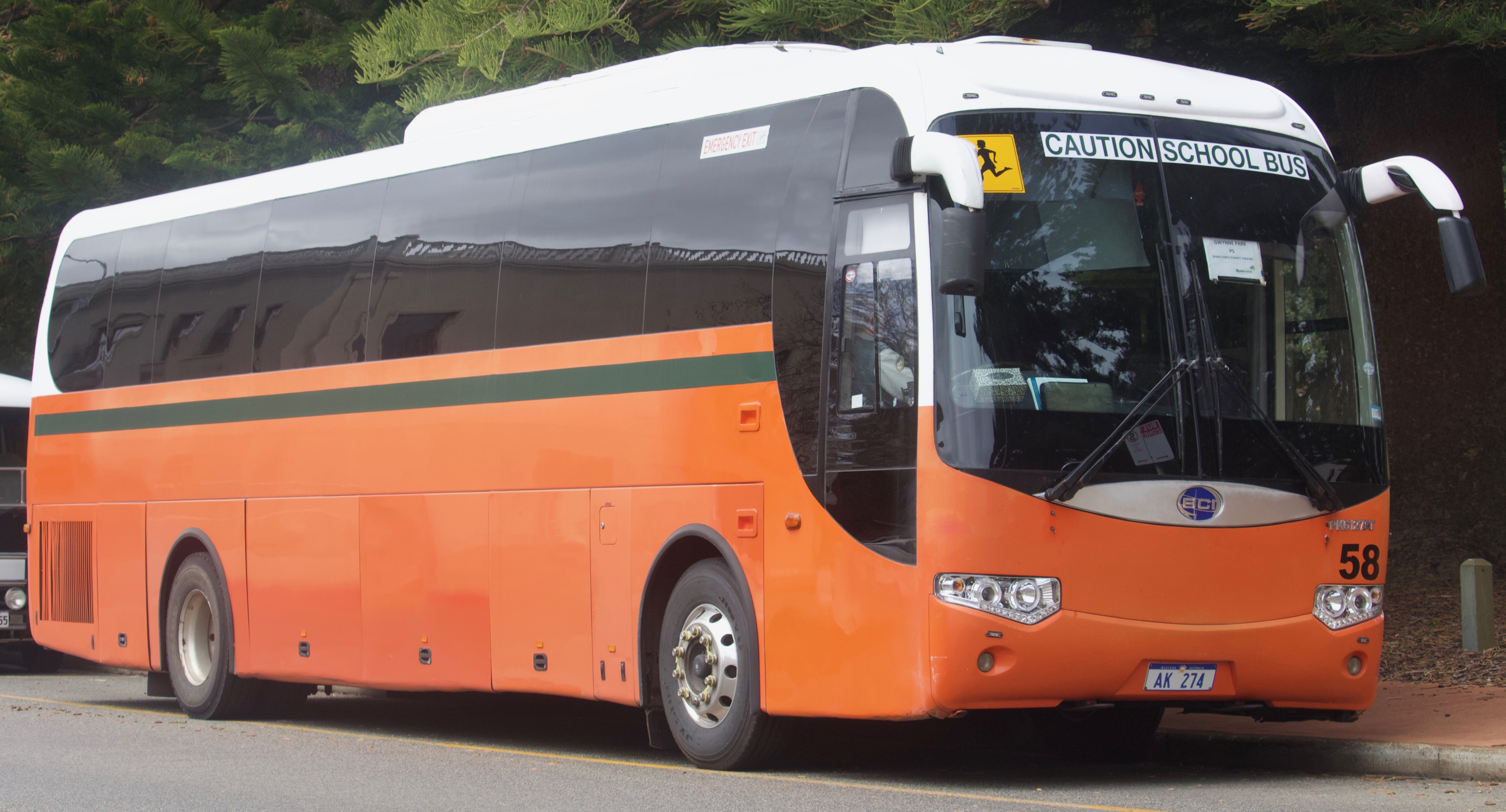
A BCI Bus PK6127AT as a school bus

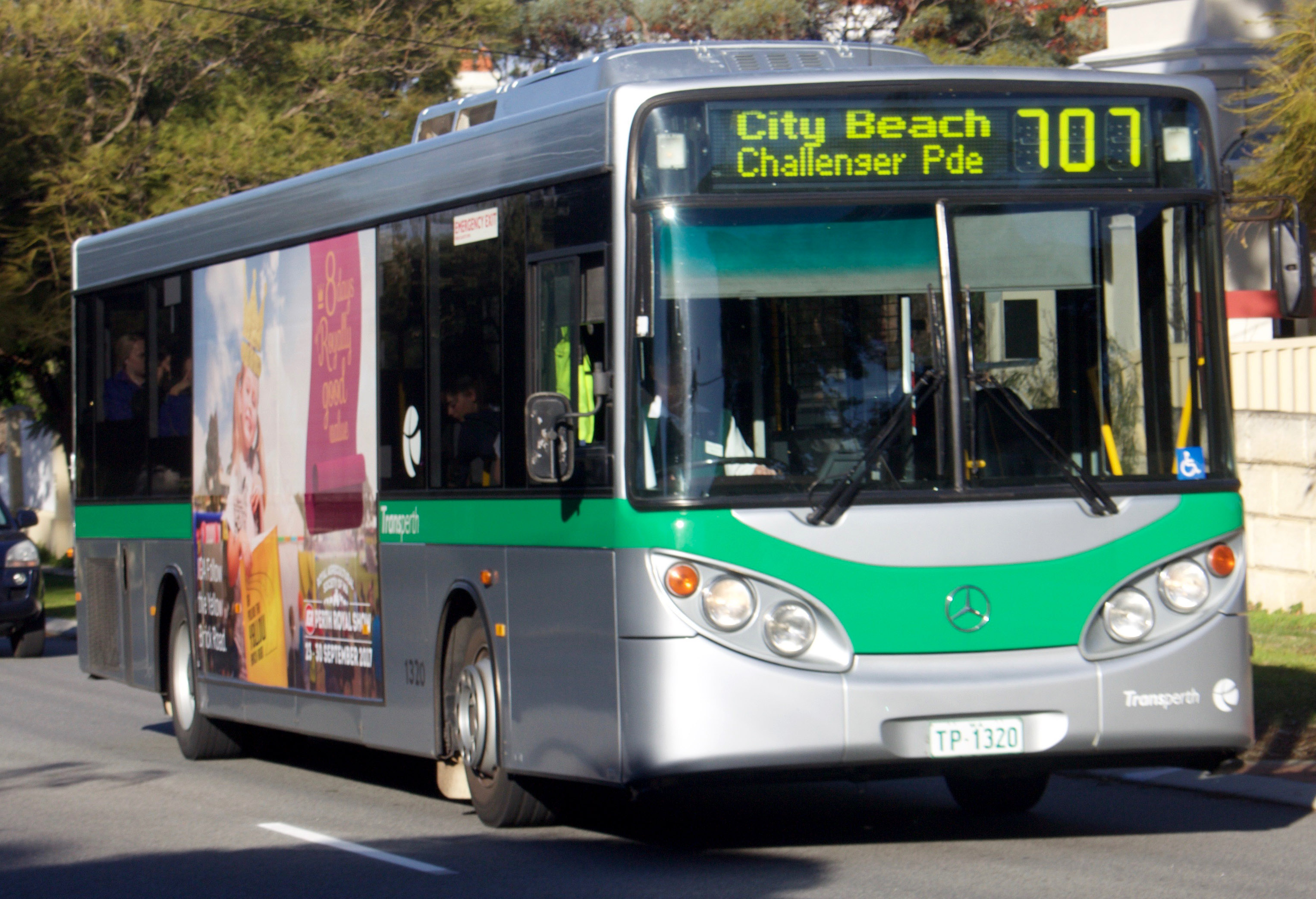
The majority of schools rely on public bus services to transport children to and from school. This Transperth bus is doing a school special run to City Beach on Route 707. Buses, like these transport school children only and as such do not allow the general adult public to ride along with the children.

In Australia, school buses vary in colour with yellow buses being rare and are distinguishable from other buses by a yellow school zone sign or a sign that reads "School Bus" on the top rear end of the bus. As school route buses are almost universally run by direct government contract, the livery of the bus is generally that of the contractor, with the bus commonly also being used for normal scheduled routes as required. In the ACT, the state government uses regular buses with the routes being in the 1000 and 2000 series. In NSW, however, the State Government has begun a program to bring all public transport in the state under one livery including strict livery regulations for new vehicles purchased for government contract use. The style is typically the same as public buses in other countries. Buses used on school routes are required to bear 40 km/h (25 mph) speed limit signs on their rear and to flashing yellow lights on the front and rear, similar to those in the US and other places. When stopping or stopped, the lights flash indicating other drivers must not travel past the bus in either direction faster than 40 km/h (the same speed limit is used in 'school zones' on roads adjacent to schools at times when most students are expected to be arriving or leaving). Drivers must also cede right of way to all buses (school or otherwise) attempting to pull out from a stop. Dedicated bus lanes are common in larger cities, where buses are also allowed to move off first from traffic lights before other traffic is shown a green light. Some areas also have dedicated busways. Increasingly, jurisdictions are requiring new buses purchased for use on school routes to be fitted with seat belts and 'compartmentalisation' features, or even requiring students to use seatbelts at all times.

Private and public schools often have 'activity' style buses, sometimes in a colour matching the 'school colours' although more commonly with just the name and logo of the school on the side and/or front of the bus to save the cost of custom painting. They are used by many schools for smaller excursions, i.e. to transport a single sport team or class, in order save on external hire costs and are consequently generally also driven by school staff. In order to allow staff to drive them with a standard car or light truck license these vehicles are generally quite small, 22 seat buses are very common in this role.

The vast majority of schools in Australia (both government and private) do not have their own buses for transporting children between the school and their home and thus most school children in Australia that do travel by bus travel on public transport buses, either on standard scheduled public transport routes, or on specific 'school travel' routes. Most school routes do not allow the general adult public to ride along with the children, although this does vary by location according to practicality (i.e. remote areas) and local regulation.

Many Australian school children travel 'free' on non-fare paying bus services to their local school or using a bus pass that they get issued at the beginning of the school year that covers transport with the relevant bus (and often other public transport such as train or ferry) network/s for travel to and from school only, for which the contractor in turn receives a government subsidy amount for each trip, although specifics of the schemes vary from state to state, some only providing subsidy to remote or low income families. Many thousands of children in Australia thus have to travel daily to school using a number of different public transport routes with different bus, train, tram and ferry networks. In most places, as of 2013, this is even achieved with a single pass.

=== New Zealand ===
In New Zealand, student transport is sometimes provided by the New Zealand Ministry of Education through school bus contractors or general bus companies. Bus companies generally have a fleet of older transit buses or coaches, different from the newer public service fleet vehicles to cater for school services.

While carrying students, buses are marked by either "SCHOOL", "SCHOOL BUS", "KURA" (Māori for "school"), or pictograms of children in black on a fluorescent chartreuse background, and are limited on the open road to 80 km/h (50 mph). These signs all indicate that a motorist should slow to 20 km/h (12 mph) when passing a stationary bus in either direction.

== Africa ==
=== Kenya ===
In Kenya, school buses are usually yellow.
