= Nanny van =

School bus service in Hong Kong

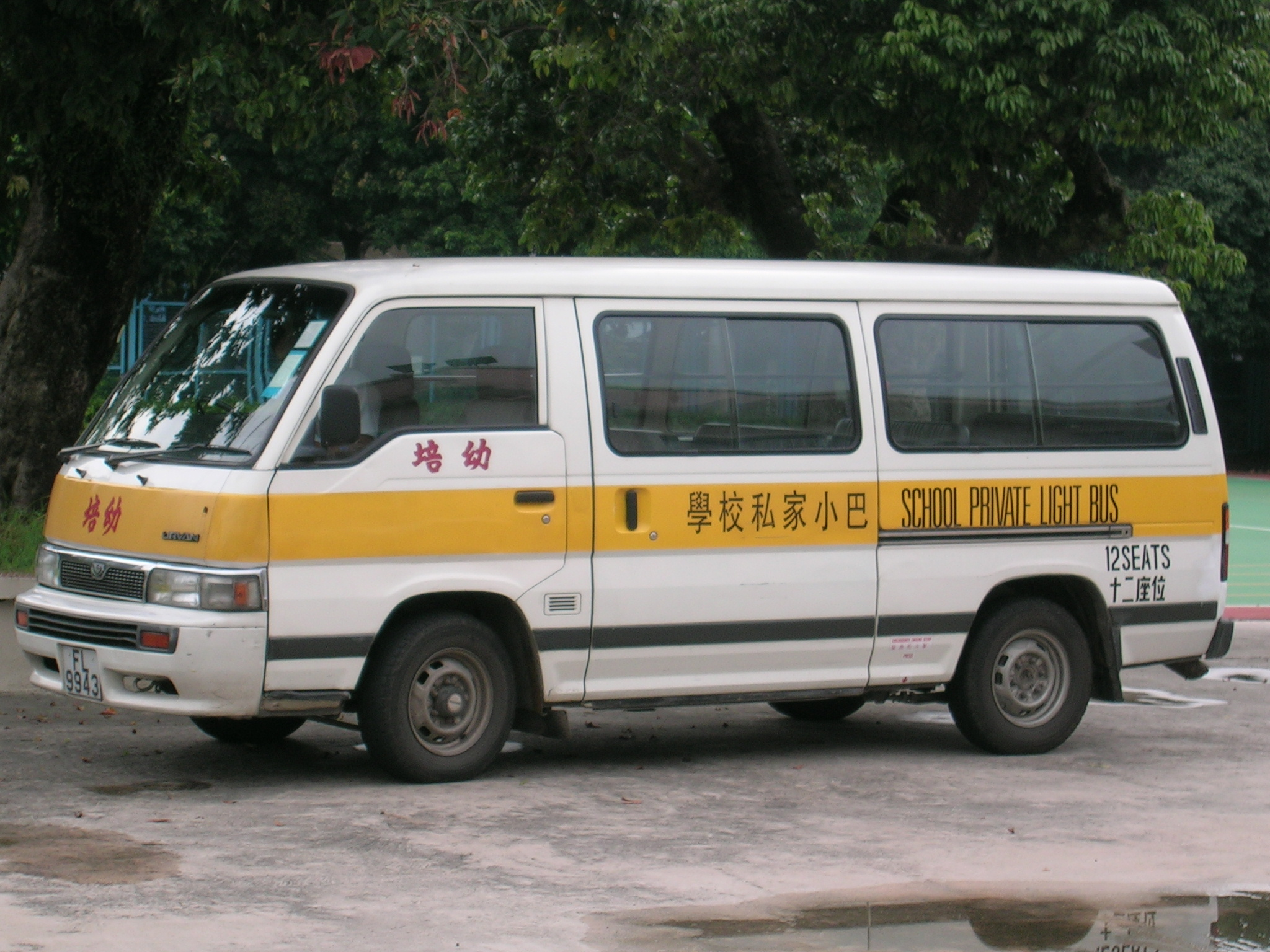
A modern Nissan Urvan nanny van. It is larger than those of the 1980s.

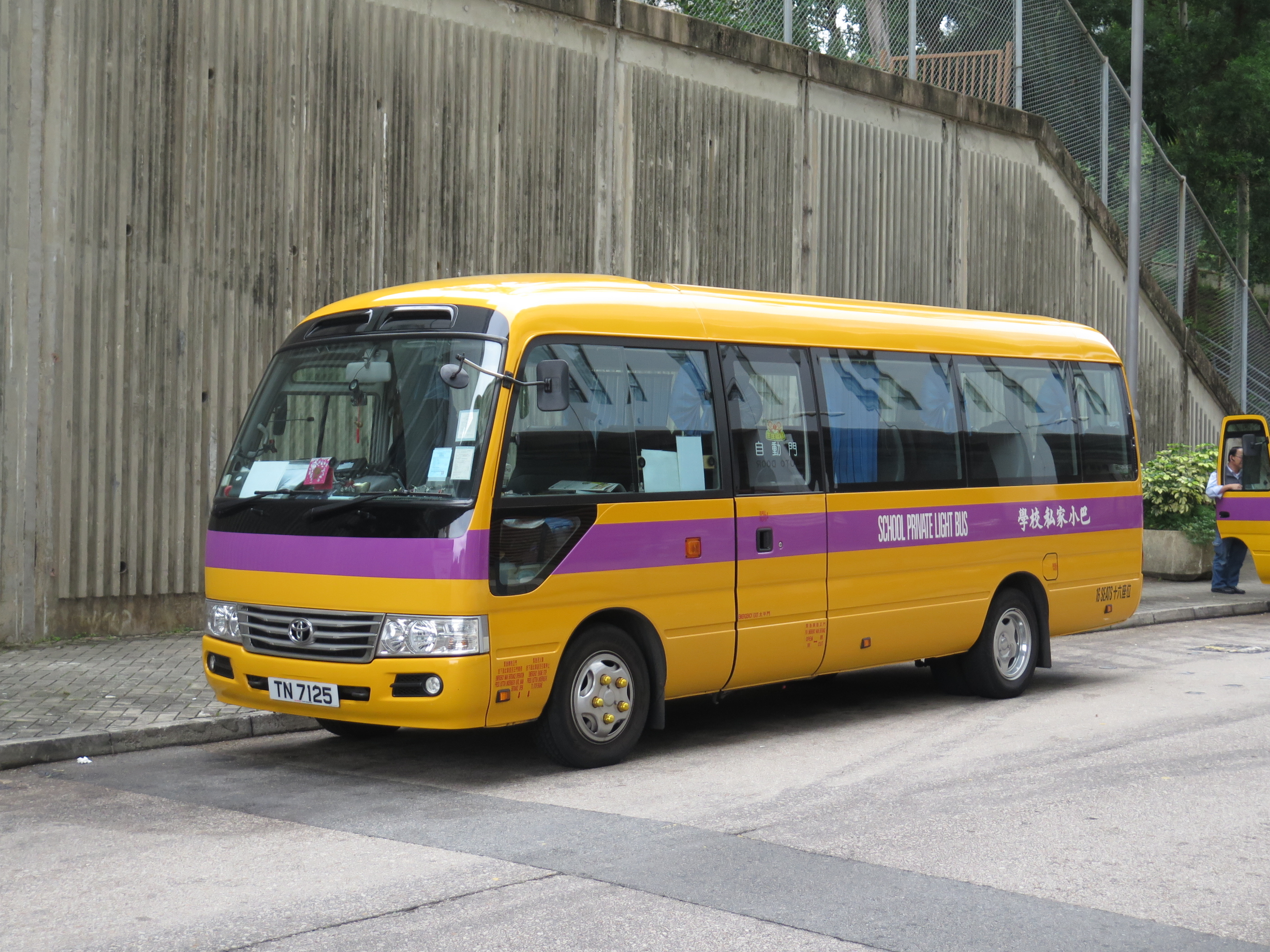
Toyota Coaster school private light bus in 2016

The nanny van (Chinese: 褓姆車) or school private light bus is a kind of school bus service in Hong Kong. At its peak of popularity during the 1980s, it had become a form of "illegal" public transportation. Subsequently, due to unauthorized use of the vans, the government banned them as a form of public transportation and required all existing nanny vans to register and operate on designated routes.

All nanny vans in service today are required by the government to have both the Chinese text "學校私家小巴" and the English text "SCHOOL PRIVATE LIGHT BUS" in capital letters painted on the sides of the vans. There were 1769 such buses registered with the Transport Department in 2014.

== History ==
Nanny vans were originally a small van operated in Hong Kong to ferry pre-school children from their homes to their nurseries and kindergartens. Most of these vans were run by private agreement between the schools and the drivers. These original nanny vans seated four to five adults; other seats in the van were removed and replaced with a narrow sofa around the cabin. With such an arrangement, the van could transport 10–12 children.

During the 1980s, when living standards in Hong Kong were rising, some drivers wanted to earn extra income with their vans. Therefore, when it was time for secondary schools to have their lunch break, the vans started to transport the younger children back to school. Each student paid about $1–2, which was about half the price for them to share a taxi. Most of these vans served North Point, where they either stopped at the North Point Pier or under Fortress Hill. They picked up school children until all the seats were occupied and traveled along the Cloud View Road, making stops at each school.

== Regulated service ==
In the early 1990s, there was an accident in North Point involving a nanny van and its passengers were injured. The accident exposed the illegal service and the government issued a ban and required all nanny vans to run only along designated routes.

Nanny vans are still available in Hong Kong. Many schools are able to afford their own vans. Less affluent schools continue to sign agreements with van drivers. These drivers provide school bus services for the more remote areas of Hong Kong, transporting school children from rural villages to schools in urban areas. The nanny vans have grown to the size of a mini bus.

School private light buses are one of three legal classified vehicles for transport of schoolchildren. The other two are non-franchised public buses and private buses operated by schools directly.

There were similar services introduced also elsewhere, for example in Richmond, Virginia.

== See also ==
- Marshrutka, an equivalent mode of transportation in some ex-Soviet Bloc countries
